This is a list of foreign players in the EFL Championship, which commenced play in 2004. The following players must meet both of the following two criteria:
Have played at least one Championship game. Players who were signed by Championship clubs, but only played in lower league, cup and/or European games, or did not play in any competitive games at all, are not included.
Are considered foreign, i.e., outside Great Britain and Ireland, determined by the following:
If a player has been capped on international level, the national team is used; if he has been capped by more than one country, the highest level (or the most recent) team is used. These include British/Irish players with dual citizenship.
If a player has not been capped on international level, his country of birth is used, except those who were born abroad from British/Irish parents or moved to Great Britain/Ireland at a young age, and those who clearly indicated to have switched his nationality to another nation.

Clubs listed are those the player has played at least one Championship game for—and seasons are those the player has played at least one Championship game in. Note that seasons, not calendar years, are used. For example, "2004–06" indicates that the player has played in every season from 2004–05 to 2005–06, but not necessarily every calendar year from 2004 to 2005

The players in Bold are those who are currently playing in Championship.

Last Updated: 8 August 2021



Albania 
Astrit Ajdarević – Leicester City, Charlton Athletic 2009–10, 2013–14
Geraldo Bajrami – Birmingham City 2019–20
Flo Bojaj – Huddersfield Town 2015–16
Edgar Çani – Leeds United 2014–15
Valentin Gjokaj – Derby County 2012–13
Florian Kamberi – Huddersfield Town 2022–
Rey Manaj – Watford 2022–
Anis Mehmeti – Wycombe Wanderers 2020–21

Algeria 
Djamel Abdoun – Nottingham Forest 2013–14
Essaïd Belkalem – Watford 2013–14
Djamel Belmadi – Southampton 2005–07
Saïd Benrahma – Brentford 2018–21
Hameur Bouazza – Watford, Charlton Athletic, Birmingham City, Blackpool, Millwall 2004–06, 2008–12
Madjid Bougherra – Crewe Alexandra Sheffield Wednesday, Charlton Athletic 2005–08
Andy Delort – Wigan Athletic 2014–15
Rafik Djebbour – Nottingham Forest 2013–14
Adlène Guedioura – Nottingham Forest, Watford, Middlesbrough, Sheffield United 2011–15, 2017–19, 2021–
Ahmed Kashi – Charlton Athletic 2015–16
Salim Kerkar – Charlton Athletic 2012–13
Riyad Mahrez – Leicester City 2013–14
Karim Matmour – Huddersfield Town 2015–16
Idriss Saadi – Cardiff City 2015–16
El Arbi Hillel Soudani – Nottingham Forest 2018–19

Angola 
Jérémie Bela – Birmingham City 2019–22
Hélder Costa – Wolverhampton Wanderers, Leeds United 2016–18, 2019–20
Lucas João – Sheffield Wednesday, Blackburn Rovers, Reading 2015–
Rui Marques – Leeds United, Hull City 2005–07
Elliot Simões – Barnsley 2019–21
 Igor Vetokele – Charlton Athletic 2014–16

Antigua and Barbuda 
 Dexter Blackstock – Plymouth Argyle, Southampton, Derby, Queens Park Rangers, Nottingham Forest, Leeds United, Rotherham United 2004–17
 Justin Cochrane – Crewe 2005–06
 Calaum Jahraldo-Martin – Hull City 2015–16
 Marc Joseph – Hull City 2005–06
 Mikele Leigertwood – Crystal Palace, Sheffield United, Queens Park Rangers, Reading 2005–06, 2007–12, 2013–14
 Josh Parker – Queens Park Rangers, Wycombe Wanderers 2009–11, 2020–21
 Mahlon Romeo – Millwall, Cardiff City 2017–

Argentina 
 Julio Arca – Sunderland, Middlesbrough 2004–05, 2009–13
 Luciano Becchio – Leeds United, Rotherham United 2010–13, 2014–15
 Federico Bessone – Swansea City, Leeds United, Millwall 2008–11, 2013–14
 Lucas Boyé – Reading 2019–20
 Gerardo Bruna – Blackpool 2011–13
 Emiliano Buendía – Norwich City 2018–19, 2020–21
 Luciano Civelli – Ipswich Town 2009–11
 Hugo Colace – Barnsley 2008–11
 Fabricio Coloccini – Newcastle United 2009–10
 Alejandro Faurlín – Queens Park Rangers 2009–11, 2013–14, 2015–16
 Federico Fernández – Swansea City 2018–19
Paulo Gazzaniga – Fulham 2021–22
 Jonás Gutiérrez – Newcastle United 2009–10
 Emmanuel Ledesma – Queens Park Rangers, Middlesbrough, Rotherham United, Brighton & Hove Albion 2008–09, 2012–16
 Emiliano Martínez – Sheffield Wednesday, Rotherham United, Wolverhampton Wanderers 2013–16
 Jerónimo Morales Neumann – Barnsley 2010–11
 Gino Padula – Queens Park Rangers 2002-05
 Elian Parrino – Sheffield United 2010–11
 Martín Payero – Middlesbrough 2021–
 Ignacio Pussetto – Watford 2020–21, 2022–
 Julián Speroni – Crystal Palace 2004–13
 Mauricio Taricco – West Ham United, Brighton & Hove Albion 2004–05, 2011–12
 Sergio Torres – Peterborough United 2009–10
 Federico Turienzo – Brighton & Hove Albion 2005–06
 Leonardo Ulloa – Brighton & Hove Albion 2012–14
 Emanuel Villa – Derby County 2008–09
 Claudio Yacob – Nottingham Forest 2018–19
 Bruno Zuculini – Middlesbrough 2015–16

Australia 
Nicholas Bilokapic – Huddersfield Town 2022–
Dean Bouzanis – Reading 2022–
Cameron Burgess – Fulham 2014–15
Tim Cahill – Millwall 2017–18
Nick Carle – Bristol City, Crystal Palace 2007–10
David Carney – Sheffield United, Norwich City 2007–09
Alex Cisak – Burnley 2013–14
Chris Coyne – Luton Town, Colchester United 2005–08
Jason Davidson – Huddersfield Town 2015–16
Kenneth Dougall – Barnsley, Blackpool 2019–20, 2021–
Ryan Edwards – Reading 2014–15
Callum Elder – Brentford, Ipswich Town, Hull City 2016–17, 2018–20, 2021–
Adam Federici – Reading, Stoke City 2004–06, 2008–12, 2013–15, 2018–20
John Filan – Wigan Athletic 2004–05
Ben Folami – Ipswich Town 2017–18
Hayden Foxe – Leeds United 2006–07
Tyrese Francois – Fulham 2021–22
Richard Garcia – West Ham United, Colchester United, Hull City 2004–05, 2006–08, 2010–12
Joel Griffiths – Leeds United 2005–06
Paul Henderson – Leicester City 2005–08
Chris Herd – Bolton Wanderers, Wigan 2014–15
Jackson Irvine – Burton Albion, Hull City 2016–20
Danny Ireland – Coventry City 2010–11
Mile Jedinak – Crystal Palace, Aston Villa 2011–13, 2016–19
Richard Johnson – Queens Park Rangers 2004–05
Brad Jones – Sheffield Wednesday, Middlesbrough, Derby County 2006–07, 2009–11
Neil Kilkenny – Birmingham City, Leeds United, Bristol City, Preston North End 2006–07, 2010–13, 2015–16
Patrick Kisnorbo – Leicester City, Leeds United, Ipswich Town 2005–08, 2012–13
Adrian Leijer – Norwich City, Sheffield United 2008–09, 2010–11
Shane Lowry – Plymouth Argyle, Leeds United, Sheffield United, Millwall, Birmingham City 2009–14, 2015–16
Massimo Luongo – Ipswich Town, Queens Park Rangers, Sheffield Wednesday 2012–13, 2015–21
Trent McClenahan – West Ham United, Scunthorpe United 2004–05, 2010–11
Scott McDonald – Middlesbrough, Millwall 2009–15
Riley McGree – Birmingham City, Middlesbrough 2020–
Jamie McMaster – Leeds United 2004–05
James Meredith – Millwall 2017–19
Aaron Mooy – Huddersfield Town 2016–17, 2019–20
Kevin Muscat – Millwall 2004–05
Lucas Neill – Watford, Doncaster Rovers 2013–14
Tommy Oar – Ipswich Town 2015–16
Tony Popovic – Crystal Palace 2005–06
Paul Reid – Brighton & Hove Albion 2004–06
Tom Rogic – West Bromwich 2022–
Josip Skoko – Stoke City 2005–06
Brad Smith – Cardiff City 2019–20
Harry Souttar – Stoke City 2020–
Mile Sterjovski – Derby County 2008–09
Danny Tiatto – Leicester City 2004–07
Tony Vidmar – Cardiff City 2004–05
Nick Ward – Queens Park Rangers 2006–08
James Wesolowski – Leicester City 2005–08
Rhys Williams – Burnley, Middlesbrough, Charlton Athletic 2008–16
Ryan Williams – Portsmouth, Fulham, Barnsley, Rotherham United 2011–12, 2014–15, 2016–17, 2018–19
Bailey Wright – Preston North End, Bristol City, Sunderland, Rotherham United 2010–11, 2015–20, 2022–
Ruben Zadkovich – Derby County 2008–09

Austria 
Daniel Bachmann – Watford 2020–21, 2022–
Moritz Bauer – Stoke City 2018–19
Guido Burgstaller – Cardiff City 2014–15
Marco Djuricin – Brentford 2015–16
Johannes Ertl – Crystal Palace, Sheffield United 2008–11
Dominik Frieser – Barnsley 2020–22
Besian Idrizaj – Luton Town, Crystal Palace, Swansea City 2006–08, 2009–10
Konstantin Kerschbaumer – Brentford 2015–17
Christoph Knasmüllner – Barnsley 2017–18
Ivan Lučić – Bristol City 2016–17
Michael Madl – Fulham 2015–17
Stefan Maierhofer – Bristol City, Millwall 2009–10, 2013–14
Georg Margreitter – Wolverhampton Wanderers 2012–13
Bobby Olejnik – Peterborough United 2012–13
Emanuel Pogatetz – Middlesbrough 2009–10
Martin Pušić – Hull City 2011–12
Marcel Ritzmaier – Barnsley 2019–
Samuel Şahin-Radlinger – Barnsley 2019–
Patrick Schmidt – Barnsley 2019–21
Michael Sollbauer – Barnsley 2019–21
Andreas Weimann – Watford, Derby County, Wolverhampton, Bristol City 2010–12, 2015–
Hannes Wolf – Swansea City 2021–

Barbados 
 Nick Blackman – Blackpool, Reading, Derby County 2008–09, 2013–17
Emmerson Boyce – Crystal Palace, Wigan Athletic 2005–06, 2013–15
Jonathan Forte – Scunthorpe United, Southampton 2007–08, 2009–12
Hallam Hope – Sheffield Wednesday 2014–15
 Paul Ifill – Millwall F.C., Sheffield United, Crystal Palace F.C. 2004–06, 2007–09
Mark McCammon – Millwall, Brighton & Hove Albion 2004–06
Krystian Pearce – Peterborough United 2009–10

Belgium 
Ameen Al-Dakhil – Burnley 2022–
Manuel Benson – Burnley 2022–
Geoffrey Mujangi Bia – Watford 2012–13
Yoni Buyens – Charlton Athletic 2014–15
Florent Cuvelier – Peterborough United 2012–13
Laurens De Bock – Leeds United 2017–18
Ritchie De Laet – Preston North End, Portsmouth, Leicester City, Middlesbrough, Aston Villa 2010–11, 2012–14, 2015–18
Steve De Ridder – Southampton, Bolton Wanderers 2011–13
Julien De Sart – Middlesbrough, Derby County 2015–17
Faris Haroun – Middlesbrough, Blackpool 2011–14
Carl Hoefkens – Stoke City, West Bromwich Albion 2005–08
Junior – Stoke City 2005–06
Christian Kabasele – Watford 2020–21, 2022–
Thomas Kaminski – Blackburn Rovers 2020–
Christophe Lepoint – Charlton 2014–15
Aaron Leya Iseka – Barnsley 2021–
Isaac Mbenza – Huddersfield Town 2019–21
Franck Moussa – Leicester City, Doncaster Rovers, Charlton Athletic 2010–12, 2014–16
Émile Mpenza – Plymouth Argyle 2008–09
Julien Ngoy – Stoke City 2019–20
Vadis Odjidja-Ofoe – Norwich City 2014–15
Tyrese Omotoye – Norwich City 2020–21
Obbi Oularé – Barnsley 2021–
Bob Peeters – Millwall 2004–05
Sébastien Pocognoli – Brighton & Hove Albion 2016–17
Jeffrey Rentmeister – Blackpool 2014–15
Matz Sels – Newcastle United 2016–17
Marnick Vermijl – Sheffield Wednesday, Preston North End 2014–18
Thibaud Verlinden – Stoke City 2018–21
Jelle Vossen – Middlesbrough, Burnley 2014–16

Benin 
Sessi D'Almeida – Barnsley 2016–17
Rudy Gestede – Cardiff City, Blackburn Rovers, Aston Villa, Middlesbrough 2011–15, 2016–20
Frédéric Gounongbe – Cardiff City 2016–18
Réda Johnson – Plymouth Argyle, Sheffield Wednesday 2009–10, 2012–14
Steve Mounié – Huddersfield Town 2019–20

Bermuda 
Ajani Burchall – Bournemouth – 2020–21
Shaun Goater – Reading, Coventry City 2003–05
Reggie Lambe – Ipswich Town 2009–11
Nahki Wells – Huddersfield Town, Queens Park Rangers, Bristol City 2013–17, 2018–

Bosnia and Herzegovina 
Anel Ahmedhodžić – Nottingham Forest, Sheffield United 2016–17, 2022-
Asmir Begović – Ipswich Town, Bournemouth 2009–10, 2020–21
Muhamed Bešić – Middlesbrough 2017–19
Milan Đurić – Bristol City 2016–18
Muhamed Konjić – Derby County 2004–05
Mario Vrančić – Norwich City, Stoke City 2017–19, 2020–

Brazil 
Adryan – Leeds United 2014–15
Anderson Silva – Barnsley 2007–10
Felipe Araruna – Reading 2019–22
Adriano Basso – Bristol City, Hull City 2006–10, 2011–12
Léo Bonatini – Wolverhampton, Nottingham Forest 2017–19
Rafael Cabral – Reading 2019–22
Evandro – Hull City 2017–19
Fábio – Cardiff City, Middlesbrough 2014–16, 2017–18
Heurelho Gomes – Watford 2014–15
Guly – Southampton 2011–12
José Júnior – Derby County, Rotherham United 2004–05
Iriney – Watford 2013–14
Matheus Martins – Watford 2022–
Marquinhos – Norwich City – 2022–
André Moritz – Crystal Palace, Bolton Wanderers 2011–14
Neuton – Watford 2012–13
João Pedro – Watford 2020–21, 2022–
Rodrigo Muniz – Fulham 2021–22
Matheus Pereira – West Bromwich Albion 2019–20
Lucas Piazon – Reading, Fulham 2015–18
Bruno Ribeiro – Blackburn Rovers 2012–13
Sandro – Queens Park Rangers 2015–16
Gabriel Sara – Norwich City – 2022–
Wellington Silva – Bolton Wanderers 2015–16
Dennis Souza – Barnsley, Doncaster Rovers 2007–09, 2010–11
Emerson Thome – Wigan Athletic, Derby County 2004–06
Vitinho – Burnley 2022–

Bulgaria 
Nikolay Bodurov – Fulham 2014–16
Dimitar Evtimov – Nottingham Forest 2013–14, 2015–16
Sylvester Jasper – Fulham 2019–20
Radostin Kishishev – Leeds United, Leicester City 2006–08
Martin Petrov – Bolton Wanderers 2012–13
Simeon Slavchev – Bolton Wanderers 2014–15
Svetoslav Todorov – Charlton Athletic 2007–09
Aleksandar Tunchev – Leicester City, Crystal Palace 2009–12

Burkina Faso 
Habib Bamogo – Doncaster Rovers 2011–12

Burundi  
Saido Berahino – Peterborough United, Stoke City 2012–13, 2018–19
Gaël Bigirimana – Coventry City 2011–12

Cameroon 
Benoît Assou-Ekotto – Queens Park Rangers 2013–14
Sébastien Bassong – Watford, Norwich City 2014–15, 2016–17
Gaëtan Bong – Wigan Athletic, Brighton & Hove Albion, Nottingham Forest 2014–17, 2019–
Steve Leo Beleck – Watford 2012–13
André Bikey-Amougou – Reading, Burnley, Bristol City, Middlesbrough, Charlton Athletic 2008–09, 2010–13, 2014–15
Serge Branco – Queens Park Rangers 2004–05
Eric Djemba-Djemba – Burnley 2006–07
Roudolphe Douala – Plymouth Argyle 2008–09
George Elokobi – Colchester United, Wolverhampton Wanderers, Nottingham Forest, Bristol City 2006–09, 2011–13
Cedric Evina – Charlton Athletic 2012–14
Jeando Fuchs – Peterborough United 2021–
Geremi – Newcastle United 2009–10
 James Léa Siliki – Middlesbrough – 2021–
Bryan Mbeumo – Brentford 2019–21
Harold Moukoudi – Middlesbrough 2019–20
Olivier Ntcham – Swansea City 2021–
Allan Nyom – West Bromwich Albion – 2018–19
Franck Songo'o – Preston North End, Crystal Palace, Sheffield Wednesday 2006–08
Patrick Suffo – Coventry City 2004–05
André-Frank Zambo Anguissa – Fulham 2021–22

Canada 
Sam Adekugbe – Brighton & Hove Albion 2016–17
Scott Arfield – Huddersfield Town, Burnley 2012–14, 2015–16
Marc Bircham – Queens Park Rangers 2004–07
Jim Brennan – Norwich, Southampton 2005–06
Theo Corbeanu – Blackpool 2022–
Jason de Vos – Ipswich Town 2004–08
David Edgar – Swansea City, Burnley, Birmingham City, Huddersfield Town 2009–15
Doneil Henry – Blackburn Rovers 2014–16
Lars Hirschfeld – Leicester City – 2004–05
Junior Hoilett – Queens Park Rangers, Cardiff City, Reading 2013–14, 2015–18, 2019–
Iain Hume – Leicester City, Barnsley, Preston North End 2004–11
Simeon Jackson – Norwich City, Millwall, Blackburn Rovers 2010–11, 2013–14, 2015–16
Ismaël Koné - Watford 2022–
Richie Laryea – Nottingham Forest 2021–
Jayson Leutwiler – Middlesbrough, Blackburn Rovers 2013–14, 2018–19
Paul Peschisolido – Derby County 2004–07
Jaime Peters – Ipswich Town 2005–12
Michael Petrasso – Queens Park Rangers 2013–14, 2015–17
Adrian Serioux – Millwall 2004–05
Josh Simpson – Millwall 2004–06
Kris Twardek – Millwall 2017–18
Iké Ugbo – Barnsley 2017–18

Cape Verde 
Alessio Da Cruz – Sheffield Wednesday 2019–20
Nuno da Costa – Nottingham Forest 2019–
Ryan Mendes – Nottingham Forest 2015–16
Pelé – Southampton, West Bromwich Albion 2006–08
Georges Santos – Queens Park Rangers 2004–06

Central African Republic 
Habib Habibou – Leeds United 2012–13
Kelly Youga – Charlton Athletic 2007–09

Chile 
Jean Beausejour – Birmingham City, Wigan Athletic 2011–12, 2013–14
Ben Brereton – Nottingham Forest, Blackburn Rovers 2016–
Gonzalo Jara – West Bromwich Albion, Brighton & Hove Albion, Nottingham Forest 2009–10, 2011–14
Marcelino Núñez – Norwich City – 2022–
Francisco Sierralta – Watford 2020–21, 2022–

China 
Tyias Browning – Wigan Athletic, Preston North End, Sunderland – 2013–14, 2016–18
Sun Jihai – Sheffield United 2008–09
Nico Yennaris – Bournemouth, Brentford 2012–13, 2014–19
Zheng Zhi – Charlton Athletic 2007–09

Chinese Taipei 
Tim Chow – Wigan Athletic 2014–15, 2016–17

Colombia 
Yaser Asprilla – Watford 2022–
Angelo Balanta – Queens Park Rangers 2007–10
Óscar Estupiñán – Hull City – 2022–
David González – Leeds United, Brighton & Hove Albion, Barsnley 2010–13
Jefferson Lerma – Bournemouth - 2020–22
Hugo Rodallega – Fulham 2014–15
Carlos Sánchez – Watford 2020–21
Jhon Viáfara – Southampton 2006–08

Comoros 
Jimmy Abdou – Plymouth Argyle, Millwall 2007–08, 2010–15
Fouad Bachirou – Nottingham Forest 2020–21

Congo 
Amine Linganzi – Preston North End 2011–12
Maheta Molango – Brighton & Hove Albion 2004–05
Prince Oniangué – Wolverhampton Wanderers 2016–18
Christopher Samba – Aston Villa 2017–18

Congo DR 
Benik Afobe – Reading, Bolton Wanderers, Millwall, Sheffield Wednesday, Wolverhampton, Stoke City, Bristol City 2011–16, 2017–
Britt Assombalonga – Watford, Nottingham Forest, Middlesbrough 2011–12, 2014–21, 2023-
Beni Baningime – Wigan, Derby County – 2018–19, 2020–
Cédric Baseya – Southampton, Reading 2007–08, 2011–12
Samuel Bastien – Burnley 2022–
Jeremie Bela – Birmingham City 2019–
Yannick Bolasie – Plymouth Argyle, Bristol City, Crystal Palace, Aston Villa, Middlesbrough 2009–10, 2011–13, 2018–19, 2020–21
Jordan Botaka – Leeds United 2015–16
Hérita Ilunga – West Ham United, Doncaster Rovers 2011–12
Elias Kachunga – Huddersfield Town, Sheffield Wednesday 2016–17, 2019–21
Trésor Kandol – Leeds United, Charlton Athletic 2006–07, 2008–09
 Patrick Kanyuka – Queens Park Rangers 2005–08
Edo Kayembe – Watford 2022–
Neeskens Kebano – Fulham, Middlesbrough 2016–18, 2019–
Kazenga LuaLua – Doncaster Rovers, Newcastle United, Brighton & Hove Albion, Queens Park Rangers, Sunderland, Luton Town 2009–10, 2011–18, 2019–
Beryly Lubala – Birmingham City 2017–19
Lomana LuaLua – Blackpool 2011–12
Jacques Maghoma – Sheffield Wednesday, Birmingham City 2013–20
Yves Ma-Kalambay – Swansea City 2010–11
Youssouf Mulumbu – West Bromwich Albion 2009–10, 2015–17
Yeni N'Gbakoto – Queens Park Rangers 2016–17
Guylain Ndumbu-Nsungu – Cardiff City 2005–06
Granddi Ngoyi – Leeds United 2014–15
Aristote Nsiala – Ipswich Town 2018–19
Pelly-Ruddock Mpanzu – Luton Town 2019–
Aaron Tshibola – Reading, Aston Villa, Nottingham Forest 2014–17
Gabriel Zakuani – Stoke City, Peterborough United 2007–08, 2009–10, 2011–13

Costa Rica 
Jewison Bennette – Sunderland 2022–
José Miguel Cubero – Blackpool 2014–16
Bryan Oviedo – Sunderland 2017–18
Bryan Ruiz – Fulham 2014–15
Álvaro Saborío – Bristol City 2009–10

Côte d'Ivoire 
Zoumana Bakayogo – Leicester City, Yeovil Town 2013–14
Sol Bamba – Leicester City, Leeds United, Cardiff City, Middlesbrough 2010–12, 2014–18, 2019–22
Vakoun Issouf Bayo – Watford 2022–
Jérémie Boga – Birmingham City 2017–18
Willy Boly – Wolverhampton Wanders 2017–18
Wilfried Bony – Swansea City 2018–19
Cyriac – Fulham 2016–17
Guy Demel – West Ham United 2011–12
Amad Diallo – Sunderland 2022–
Aruna Dindane – Crystal Palace 2012–13 
Seko Fofana – Fulham 2014–15
Hassane Kamara – Watford 2022–
Cédric Kipré – Wigan Athletic, West Bromwich Albion, Cardiff City 2018–20, 2021–
Jonathan Kodjia – Bristol City, Aston Villa 2015–19
Lamine Koné – Sunderland 2017–18
Abdoulaye Méïté – West Bromwich Albion, Doncaster Rovers 2009–10, 2013–14
Yakou Méïté – Reading 2016–17, 2018–
Abdul Razak – Portsmouth, Brighton & Hove Albion, Charlton 2011–13
Yannick Sagbo – Wolverhampton Wanderers 2014–15
Jean Michaël Seri – Fulham, Hull City 2021–
Olivier Tébily – Birmingham City 2006–07
Christ Tiéhi – Wigan Athletic 2022–
Cheick Tioté – Newcastle United 2016–17
Wilfried Zaha – Crystal Palace 2009–13
François Zoko – Blackpool 2014–15

Croatia 
Filip Benković – Barnsley, Cardiff City 2019–21
Ahmet Brković – Luton Town 2005–07
Alen Halilović – Birmingham City, Reading 2020–22
Nikica Jelavić – Hull City 2015–16
Lovre Kalinić – Aston Villa 2018–19
Niko Kranjčar – Queens Park Rangers 2013–14
Filip Krovinović – West Bromwich Albion, Nottingham Forest 2019–21
Ivan Paurević – Huddersfield Town 2016–17
Stipe Perica – Watford 2020–21
Simon Sluga – Luton Town 2019–22
Ivan Šunjić – Birmingham City 2019-22
Filip Uremović – Sheffield United 2021-22

Cuba  
Onel Hernández – Norwich City, Middlesbrough, Birmingham City 2017–19, 2020–

Curaçao 
Kemy Agustien – Birmingham City, Swansea City, Crystal Palace, Brighton & Hove Albion 2008–09, 2010–11, 2013–15
Vurnon Anita – Newcastle United, Leeds United 2016–18
Juninho Bacuna – Huddersfield Town, Birmingham City 2019–
Leandro Bacuna – Aston Villa, Reading, Cardiff City, Watford 2016–
Gervane Kastaneer – Coventry City 2020–21
Cuco Martina – Stoke City 2018–19
Shelton Martis – West Bromwich Albion, Scunthorpe United, Doncaster Rovers 2009–12

Cyprus 
Nicholas Ioannou – Nottingham Forest 2020–21
Alexis Nicolas – Brighton & Hove Albion 2004–06
Giorgos Tofas – Queens Park Rangers 2010–11
Tom Williams – Peterborough United, Queens Park Rangers, Preston North End, Bristol City 2009–11

Czech Republic 
Roman Bednář – West Bromwich Albion, Leicester City, Blackpool 2007–08, 2009–12
Patrik Berger – Stoke City 2006–07
Radek Černý – Queens Park Rangers 2008–13
Tomáš Egert – Burton Albion 2017–18
Tomáš Kalas – Middlesbrough, Fulham, Bristol City 2014–
Martin Kolář – Stoke City 2005–06
Libor Kozák – Aston Villa 2016–17
Mario Lička – Southampton 2006–08
Marek Matějovský – Reading 2008–10
Ondřej Mazuch – Hull City 2017–19
Tomáš Pekhart – Southampton 2008–09
Pavel Pergl – Preston North End 2006–07
Daniel Pudil – Watford, Sheffield Wednesday 2012–19
Tomáš Řepka – West Ham United 2004–05
Rudolf Skácel – Southampton 2006–09
Jiří Skalák – Brighton & Hove Albion, Millwall 2015–17, 2018–21
Marek Štěch – Yeovil Town 2013–14
David Střihavka – Norwich City 2007–08
Filip Twardzik – Bolton Wanderers 2014–16
Tomáš Vaclík – Huddersfield Town 2022–
Matěj Vydra – Watford, Reading, Derby County 2012–13, 2014–18
Jan Žambůrek – Brentford 2018–21

Denmark 
Martin Albrechtsen – West Bromwich Albion, Derby County 2006–09
Mads Juel Andersen – Barnsley 2019–
Mikkel Andersen – Reading 2014–15
Casper Ankergren – Leeds United, Brighton & Hove Albion 2006–07, 2011–14
Mads Bech Sørensen – Brentford 2018–21
Nicklas Bendtner – Birmingham City, Nottingham Forest 2006–07, 2016–17
Jens Berthel Askou – Norwich City, Millwall 2010–11
Philip Billing – Huddersfield Town, Bournemouth 2013–17, 2020–
Mikkel Bischoff – Wolverhampton Wanderers, Sheffield Wednesday, Coventry City 2004–07
Morten Bisgaard – Derby County 2004–07
Mads Bidstrup – Brentford 2020–21
Andreas Bjelland – Brentford 2015–18
Martin Braithwaite – Middlesbrough 2017–19
Nicolai Brock-Madsen – Birmingham City 2015–16
Jan Budtz – Wolverhampton Wanderers 2006–07
Oskar Buur – Wolverhampton Wanderers 2017–18
Kim Christensen – Barnsley 2007–08
Lasse Vigen Christensen – Fulham, Burton 2014–17
Henrik Dalsgaard – Brentford 2017–21
Adda Djeziri – Blackpool 2012–13
Frederik Fisker Nielsen – Sheffield Wednesday 2017–18
Per Frandsen – Wigan Athletic 2004–05
Jakob Haugaard – Wigan Athletic 2016–17
Daniel Iversen – Preston North End F.C. 2020–
Brian Jensen – Burnley 2004–09, 2010–13
Mathias Jensen – Brentford 2019–21
Jonas Knudsen – Ipswich Town F.C. 2015–19
William Kvist – Wigan Athletic 2014–15
Anders Lindegaard – Preston North End F.C. 2015–17
Jonas Lössl – Huddersfield Town 2019–
Peter Løvenkrands – Newcastle United, Birmingham City 2009–10, 2012–14
Peter Madsen – Southampton F.C. 2005–06
Emiliano Marcondes – Brentford, Bournemouth 2017–
Simon Makienok – Charlton Athletic F.C., Preston North End F.C. 2015–17
Christian Nørgaard – Brentford 2019–21
Marc Nygaard – Queens Park Rangers F.C. 2005–08
William Osula – Sheffield United 2021–
Henrik Pedersen – Hull City 2006–07
Kristian Pedersen – Birmingham City 2018–
Luka Racic – Brentford 2018–20
Marco Ramkilde – Queens Park Rangers F.C. 2019–
Emil Riis Jakobsen – Preston North End 2020–
Mads Roerslev Rasmussen – Brentford 2019–21
Kasper Schmeichel – Cardiff City, Coventry City, Leeds United, Leicester City 2007–08, 2010–14
Jakob Sørensen – Norwich City 2020–21, 2022-
Lasse Sørensen – Stoke City 2018–20
Justin Shaibu – Brentford 2016–18
Casper Sloth – Leeds United 2014–16
Lasse Vibe – Brentford 2015–18
Sammy Youssouf – Queens Park Rangers F.C. 2005–06
Philip Zinckernagel – Watford, Nottingham Forest 2020–
Kenneth Zohore – Cardiff City, West Bromwich Albion, Millwall 2015–18, 2019–

Ecuador 
Ulises de la Cruz – Birmingham City 2008–09
Jefferson Montero – Swansea City, West Bromwich Albion, Birmingham City 2018–20
Juan Carlos Paredes – Watford 2014–15
Joel Valencia – Brentford 2019–20

Egypt 
Adam El-Abd – Brighton & Hove Albion 2004–06, 2011–14
Ahmed Elmohamady – Hull City, Aston Villa 2012–13, 2015–16, 2017–19
Ahmed Fathy – Hull City 2012–13
Ahmed Hegazy – West Bromwich Albion – 2018–20
Sam Morsy – Wigan Athletic, Barnsley, Middlesbrough 2016–17, 2018–
Mohamed Nagy – Hull City 2012–13
Mido – Barnsley 2012–13

Equatorial Guinea 
Emilio Nsue – Middlesbrough, Birmingham City 2014–18

Estonia 
Karl Hein – Reading 2021–22
Tarmo Kink – Middlesbrough 2010–12
Mart Poom – Sunderland, Watford 2004–05, 2007–09
Andrei Stepanov – Watford 2008–09
Sergei Zenjov – Blackpool 2014–15

Faroe Islands 
Claus Bech Jørgensen – Coventry City, Blackpool 2004–09

Finland 
Peter Enckelman – Cardiff City 2006–10
Marcus Forss – Brentford, Hull City, Middlesbrough 2018–
Mikael Forssell – Birmingham City, Leeds United 2005–06, 2011–12
Aapo Halme – Leeds United, Barnsley 2018–
Niko Hämäläinen – Queens Park Rangers 2016–17, 2020–
Markus Heikkinen – Luton Town 2005–07
Anssi Jaakkola – Reading 2017–19
Jussi Jääskeläinen – Wigan Athletic 2016–17
Jonatan Johansson – Norwich City 2005–06
Jesse Joronen – Fulham 2014–15
Toni Kallio – Sheffield United 2009–10
Joonas Kolkka – Crystal Palace 2005–06
Peter Kopteff – Stoke City 2005–06
Toni Koskela – Cardiff City 2004–05
Shefki Kuqi – Swansea City, Crystal Palace 2009–11
Thomas Lam – Nottingham Forest 2016–17
Niki Mäenpää – Brighton & Hove Albion, Bristol City 2016–17, 2018–20
Sakari Mattila – Fulham 2015–16
Antti Niemi – Southampton 2005–06
Jaakko Oksanen – Brentford 2018–20
Teemu Pukki – Norwich City 2018–19, 2020–21, 2022–
Aki Riihilahti – Crystal Palace 2005–06
Sampsa Timoska – Queens Park Rangers 2007–08
Mika Väyrynen – Leeds United 2011–12

France 
Jérémie Aliadière – Wolverhampton Wanderers, Middlesbrough 2005–06, 2009–10
Jordan Amavi – Aston Villa 2016–17
Tony Andreu – Norwich City, Rotherham United 2014–16
Jean-Kévin Augustin – Leeds United 2019–20
Abdoullah Ba – Sunderland 2022–
El Hadji Ba – Charlton 2015–16
Sekou Baradji – Reading 2005–06
Yoann Barbet – Brentford, Queens Park Rangers 2015–
Guillaume Beuzelin – Coventry City 2008–09
Maxime Biamou – Coventry City 2020–21
Bertrand Bossu – Gillingham 2004–05
Julien Brellier – Norwich City 2007–08
Jean Calvé – Sheffield United 2010–11
Etienne Camara – Huddersfield Town 2022–
Étienne Capoue – Watford 2020–21
Florent Chaigneau – Brighton & Hove Albion 2005–06
Pascal Chimbonda – Queens Park Rangers, Doncaster Rovers 2010–12
Aly Cissokho – Aston Villa 2016–17
Maxime Colin – Brentford, Birmingham City 2015–
Mohamed Coulibaly – Bournemouth 2013–14
Francis Coquelin – Charlton 2014–15
Julien Dacosta – Coventry City 2020–
Loïc Damour – Cardiff City 2017–18
Éric Deloumeaux – Coventry City 2004–05
Moussa Dembélé – Fulham 2014–16
Dorian Dervite – Charlton, Bolton Wanderers 2012–16, 2017–18
Sylvain Deslandes – Wolverhampton Wanders 2015–16, 2017–18
Toumani Diagouraga – Watford, Peterborough United, Brentford, Leeds United, Ipswich Town 2005–06, 2009–10, 2014–17
Adama Diakhaby – Huddersfield Town, Nottingham Forest 2019–21
Alou Diarra – Charlton 2014–16
Brahima Diarra – Huddersfield Town 2020–
Claude Dielna – Sheffield Wednesday 2014–15
Didier Digard – Middlesbrough 2009–10
Loïs Diony – Bristol City 2017–18
Pierre Ekwah – Sunderland 2022–
Mounir El Haimour – Barnsley 2008–10
Jean-Alain Fanchone – Watford 2012–13
Rod Fanni – Charlton Athletic 2015–16
Marc-Antoine Fortuné – Doncaster Rovers, Wigan Athletic 2011–12, 2013–15
David Friio – Plymouth Argyle, Nottingham Forest 2004–05
Romain Gasmi – Southampton 2008–09
Gaël Givet – Blackburn Rovers 2012–14
Luigi Glombard – Cardiff City, Leicester City 2006–07
Arthur Gnohéré – Queens Park Rangers 2004–05
Claudio Gomes – Barnsley 2021–22
Kévin Gomis – Nottingham Forest 2013–14
Prince-Désir Gouano – Bolton Wanderers 2015–16
Yoan Gouffran – Newcastle United 2016–17
Hérold Goulon – Doncaster Rovers 2011–12
Elliot Grandin – Blackpool 2011–13
Léandre Griffit – Leeds United, Rotherham United, Crystal Palace 2004–05, 2008–09
Massadio Haïdara – Newcastle United 2016–17
Jérémy Hélan – Sheffield Wednesday 2012–14
William Hondermarck – Barnsley 2021–
Jimmy Juan – Ipswich Town 2005–06
Aldo Kalulu – Swansea City 2019–20
Yann Kermorgant – Leicester City, Charlton Athletic, Bournemouth, Reading 2009–10, 2012–18
Williams Kokolo – Middlesbrough 2021–22
Ateef Konaté – Nottingham Forest 2021–
Anthony Knockaert – Leicester City, Brighton & Hove Albion, Fulham, Nottingham Forest 2012–14, 2015–17, 2019–
Bengali-Fodé Koita – Blackburn Rovers 2015–16
Mathias Kouo-Doumbé – Plymouth Argyle 2004–09
Romain Larrieu – Plymouth Argyle 2004–10
Florent Laville – Coventry City 2004–05
Maxime Le Marchand – Fulham 2019–20
Sylvain Legwinski – Ipswich Town 2006–08
Isaac Lihadji – Sunderland 2022–
Matthieu Louis-Jean – Norwich City 2005–06
Mikael Mandron – Wigan Athletic 2016–17
Mathieu Manset – Reading 2010–12
Nicolas Marin – Plymouth Argyle 2008–09
Malaury Martin – Middlesbrough 2011–13
Han-Noah Massengo – Bristol City 2019–
 Neal Maupay – Brentford 2017–19
Youl Mawéné – Preston North End 2004–10
Loïc Mbe Soh – Nottingham Forest 2020–
Joseph Mendes – Reading 2016–18
Illan Meslier – Leeds United 2019–20
Edouard Michut – Sunderland 2022–
Yohan Mollo – Fulham 2017–18
Lys Mousset – Sheffield United 2021–
Guy Moussi – Nottingham Forest, Millwall, Birmingham City 2008–15
Yassin Moutaouakil – Charlton Athletic 2007–09
Jean-Yves Mvoto – Barnsley 2013–14
Lilian Nalis – Leicester City, Sheffield United, Coventry City, Plymouth Argyle 2004–08
Alassane N'Diaye – Crystal Palace 2009–11
David N'Gog – Bolton Wanderers 2012–14
Dany N'Guessan – Leicester City, Millwall 2009–13
Guylain Ndumbu-Nsungu – Preston North End, Cardiff City 2004–06
Christian Negouai – Coventry City 2004–05
Bruno Ngotty – Birmingham City, Leicester City 2006–08
Niels Nkounkou – Cardiff City 2022–
Gabriel Obertan – Wigan Athletic 2016–17
Fabrice Pancrate – Newcastle United 2009–10
Vincent Péricard – Sheffield United, Plymouth Argyle, Stoke City, Southampton 2005–08
Frédéric Piquionne – West Ham United, Doncaster Rovers 2011–12
Damien Plessis – Doncaster Rovers 2011–12
Franck Queudrue – Birmingham City 2008–09
Fabien Robert – Doncaster Rovers 2011–12
Brice Samba – Nottingham Forest 2019–22
Yaya Sanogo – Charlton, Huddersfield Town 2015–16, 2020–21
Amadou Sanokho – Burnley 2004–05
Vincent Sasso – Sheffield Wednesday 2015–16
Morgan Schneiderlin – Southampton 2008–09, 2011–12
Saër Sène – Blackpool 2014–15
Antoine Sibierski – Norwich City 2008–09
Éric Skora – Preston North End 2004–05
Youssef Sofiane – Coventry City 2005–06
Yan Valery – Birmingham City 2020–21
Jean-Louis Valois – Burnley 2004–05
Grégory Vignal – Southampton 2007–08
Romain Vincelot – Brighton & Hove Albion 2011–13
Rémy Vita – Barnsley 2021–

Gabon 
Frédéric Bulot – Charlton Athletic 2014–15
Bruno Ecuele Manga – Cardiff City 2014–18
Didier Ibrahim Ndong – Sunderland 2017–18

Gambia 
Modou Barrow – Nottingham Forest, Blackburn Rovers, Leeds United, Reading 2014–20
Mustapha Carayol – Middlesbrough, Brighton & Hove Albion, Huddersfield Town, Leeds United, Nottingham Forest, Ipswich Town 2012–18
Saidy Janko – Bolton Wanderers, Barnsley, Nottingham Forest 2014–15, 2016–17, 2018–19
Saikou Janneh – Bristol City 2020–
Omar Koroma – Norwich City 2008–09
Cherno Samba – Plymouth Argyle 2006–07
Seyfo Soley – Preston North End 2006–07

Georgia 
Zurab Khizanishvili – Newcastle United, Reading 2009–11

Germany 
Jordan Amissah – Sheffield United 2022–
 Mike-Steven Bähre – Barnsley 2019–20
 Patrick Bauer – Charlton, Preston North End 2015–16, 2019–
Steven Benda – Swansea City, Peterborough United 2020–
Jordan Beyer – Burnley 2022–
 Eugen Bopp – Nottingham Forest 2004–05
 Julian Börner – Sheffield Wednesday 2019–21
Leon Dajaku – Sunderland 2022–
 Max Ehmer – Queens Park Rangers 2013–14
 Thomas Eisfeld – Fulham 2014–15
 Marcel Franke – Norwich City 2017–18
 Fabian Giefer – Bristol City 2016–17
 Robert Glatzel – Cardiff City 2019–21
 Akaki Gogia – Brentford 2015–16
 Maximilian Haas – Middlesbrough 2010–11
 Michael Hefele – Huddersfield Town, Nottingham Forest 2016–17, 2018–19
 Jens Hegeler – Bristol City 2016–18
 Rouwen Hennings – Burnley 2015–16
 Philipp Hofmann – Brentford 2015–17
 Lewis Holtby – Blackburn Rovers 2019–21
 Tim Hoogland – Fulham 2014–15
 Uwe Hünemeier – Brighton & Hove Albion 2015–17
 Robert Huth – Middlesbrough 2009–10
Vitaly Janelt – Brentford 2020–21
Reda Khadra – Blackburn Rovers, Sheffield United 2021–
Jan Kirchhoff – Bolton Wanderers 2017–18
 Pierre-Michel Lasogga – Leeds United 2017–18
Toni Leistner – Queens Park Rangers 2018–20
Moritz Leitner – Norwich City 2017–19
 Chris Löwe – Huddersfield Town 2016–17
 Kilian Ludewig – Barnsley 2019–21
 Heinz Müller – Barnsley 2007–09
Lukas Nmecha – Preston North End, Middlesbrough 2018–20
Felix Passlack – Norwich City 2018–19
 Sebastian Polter – Queens Park Rangers 2015–17
 Nick Proschwitz – Hull City, Barnsley, Brentford 2012–15
 Collin Quaner – Huddersfield Town, Ipswich Town 2016–17, 2018–20
 Marco Reich – Derby County, Crystal Palace 2004–07
 Lukas Rupp – Norwich City 2020–21
Dennis Srbeny – Norwich City 2017–19
 Christopher Schindler – Huddersfield Town 2016–17, 2019–21
 Marco Stiepermann – Norwich City 2017–19, 2020–21
 Robert Tesche – Nottingham Forest, Birmingham City 2014–17
Tom Trybull – Norwich City, Blackburn Rovers, Blackpool 2017–19, 2020–21, 2023-
Andreas Voglsammer – Millwall 2022–
Moritz Volz  – Ipswich Town 2008–09
Dominik Werling – Barnsley 2007–08
Felix Wiedwald – Leeds United 2017–18
Christoph Zimmermann – Norwich City 2017–19, 2020–21

Ghana 
Kelvin Abrefa – Reading – 2021–
Albert Adomah – Bristol City, Middlesbrough, Aston Villa, Nottingham Forest, Cardiff City, Queens Park Rangers 2010–
Kwesi Appiah – Crystal Palace, Reading 2011–13, 2014–15
Koby Arthur – Birmingham City 2012–15
Christian Atsu – Newcastle United 2016–17
André Ayew – Swansea City 2019–21
Jordan Ayew – Aston Villa 2016–17
Prince Buaben – Watford 2011–13
Chris Dickson – Charlton Athletic 2007–09
Caleb Ekuban – Leeds United 2017–18
Tariqe Fosu – Reading, Brentford, Stoke City 2014–15, 2019–21, 2022-
Emmanuel Frimpong – Charlton Athletic, Barnsley 2012–14
Elvis Hammond – Leicester City 2005–07
Elvis Manu – Brighton & Hove Albion, Huddersfield Town 2015–17
Eddie Nketiah – Leeds United 2019–20
Denis Odoi – Fulham 2016–18, 2019–20, 2021–22
Lloyd Owusu – Reading 2004–05
Quincy Owusu-Abeyie – Birmingham City , Cardiff City 2008–09
John Pantsil – Leicester City 2011–12
Kwame Poku – Peterborough United 2021–
Abdul Rahman Baba – Reading 2021–
Lloyd Sam – Sheffield Wednesday, Southend United, Charlton Athletic, Leeds United 2006–09, 2010–12
Jeffrey Schlupp – Leicester City 2011–14
Antoine Semenyo – Bristol City 2017–
Benjamin Tetteh – Hull City 2022–
Andy Yiadom – Barnsley, Reading 2016–

Gibraltar 
Danny Higginbotham – Southampton, Stoke City, Nottingham Forest, Ipswich Town 2005–08, 2011–13
Carlos Richards – Derby County 2021–
Scott Wiseman – Hull City, Barnsley 2005–06, 2011–14

Greece 
George Baldock – MK Dons, Sheffield United – 2015–16, 2017–19, 2021–
Andreas Bouchalakis – Nottingham Forest 2017–18
Nikos Dabizas – Leicester City 2004–05
Dimitrios Giannoulis – Norwich City 2020–21, 2022–
Stefanos Kapino – Nottingham Forest 2017–18
Nikos Karelis – Brentford 2019–20
Dimitrios Konstantopoulos – Coventry City, Cardiff City, Swansea City, Middlesbrough 2007–10, 2013–16
Dimitrios Pelkas – Hull City – 2022–
Kostas Stafylidis – Fulham 2014–15
Christos Tzolis – Norwich City 2022–
Apostolos Vellios – Blackpool, Nottingham Forest 2013–14, 2016–18

Grenada 
Shandon Baptiste – Brentford 2019–21
Regan Charles-Cook – Charlton Athletic 2015–16
Antonio German – Queens Park Rangers 2008–11
Leon Johnson – Gillingham 2004–05
Oliver Norburn – Peterborough United 2021–
Jason Roberts – Wigan Athletic, Reading 2004–05, 2011–12
Craig Rocastle – Sheffield Wednesday 2005–06

Guadeloupe 
Dimitri Kevin Cavaré – Barnsley 2017–20
Pascal Chimbonda – Queens Park Rangers, Doncaster Rovers 2010–12
Miguel Comminges – Cardiff City 2008–10
Joël Dielna – Blackpool 2014–15
Therry Racon – Charlton Athletic, Millwall 2007–09, 2011–13
Ludovic Sylvestre – Blackpool 2011–13
Yohann Thuram-Ulien – Charlton Athletic 2013–14
Ronald Zubar – Wolverhampton Wanderers 2012–13

Guinea-Bissau 
Mamadi Camará – Reading 2020–
Ivanildo Cassamá – Nottingham Forest 2019–
Marcelo Djaló – Fulham 2017–18
Arnaud Mendy – Derby County 2009–10
Formose Mendy – Blackpool 2014–15
Pelé – Nottingham Forest, Reading 2018–
Alfa Semedo – Nottingham Forest, Reading 2019–21
Toni Silva – Barnsley 2012–13

Guinea 
Sambégou Bangoura – Stoke City 2005–07
Abdoul Camara – Derby County 2015–17
Mohammed Camara – Norwich City, Blackpool, Derby County 2007–09
Ibrahima Cissé – Fulham 2017–18
Drissa Diallo – Ipswich Town, Sheffield Wednesday 2004–06
Julian Jeanvier – Brentford 2018–20
Sory Kaba – Cardiff City – 2022–
Bengali-Fodé Koita – Blackburn Rovers 2015–16
Idrissa Sylla – Queens Park Rangers 2016–19
Larsen Touré – Ipswich Town 2015–16
Kamil Zayatte – Hull City, Sheffield Wednesday 2010–11, 2013–15

Guyana 
Matthew Briggs – Peterborough United, Bristol City, Watford, Millwall 2011–13, 2014–15
Carl Cort – Wolverhampton Wanderers, Leicester City, Norwich City 2004–09
Leon Cort – Hull City, Crystal Palace, Stoke City, Burnley, Preston North End, Charlton Athletic 2005–08, 2010–11, 2012–14
Neil Danns – Birmingham City, Crystal Palace, Leicester City, Bristol City, Huddersfield Town, Bolton Wanderers 2006–16
Stephen Duke-McKenna – Queens Park Rangers 2020–21
Callum Harriott – Charlton Athletic, Reading 2012–19

Honduras 
Carlo Costly – Birmingham City 2008–09
Roger Espinoza – Wigan Athletic 2013–15
Maynor Figueroa – Wigan Athletic 2014–15
Ramón Núñez – Leeds United, Scunthorpe United 2010–12

Hungary 
Bálint Bajner – Ipswich Town 2014–15
Béla Balogh – Colchester United 2007–08
Norbert Balogh — Hull City 2019–20
Ádám Bogdán – Bolton Wanderers, Wigan Athletic 2012–15, 2016–17
Gábor Bori – Leicester City 2007–08
Ákos Buzsáky – Plymouth Argyle, Queens Park Rangers, Barnsley 2004–12
István Ferenczi – Barnsley 2006–08
Márton Fülöp – Coventry City, Sunderland, Leicester City, Ipswich Town 2005–07, 2010–11
Márkó Futács – Portsmouth, Leicester City, Blackpool 2011–13
Zoltán Gera – West Bromwich Albion 2006–08
Péter Gulácsi – Hull City 2011–12
Gábor Gyepes – Wolverhampton Wanderers, Cardiff City 2005–07, 2008–12
Péter Halmosi – Plymouth Argyle 2006–08
Tamás Kádár – Newcastle United 2009–10
Gábor Király – Crystal Palace, Burnley, Fulham 2005–08, 2014–15
Péter Kurucz – West Ham United 2011–12
Zsolt Laczkó – Leicester City 2007–08
Zoltán Lipták – Southampton 2008–09
Ádám Nagy – Bristol City 2019–21
Loïc Nego – Charlton Athletic 2013–14
Tamas Priskin – Watford, Preston North End, Ipswich Town, Queens Park Rangers, Swansea City, Derby County 2007–12
Péter Rajczi – Barnsley 2006–07
Dénes Rósa  – Wolverhampton Wanderers 2005–09
Callum Styles – Barnsley 2019–
Krisztián Timár – Plymouth Argyle 2006–10
Dániel Tőzsér – Watford, Queens Park Rangers 2013–16
József Varga – Middlesbrough 2013–14
Tamás Vaskó – Bristol City 2007–08

Iceland 
Kári Árnason – Plymouth Argyle, Rotherham United 2009–10, 2014–15
Jóhann Berg Guðmundsson – Charlton Athletic, Burnley 2014–16, 2022–
Birkir Bjarnason – Aston Villa 2016–19
Jón Daði Böðvarsson – Wolverhampton Wanderers, Reading, Millwall 2016–21
Gylfi Einarsson – Leeds United 2004–07
Daníel Leó Grétarsson – Blackpool 2021–22
Bjarni Guðjónsson – Coventry City, Plymouth Argyle 2004–06
Joey Guðjónsson – Leicester City, Burnley 2004–09
Eiður Guðjohnsen – Bolton Wanderers 2014–15
Þórður Guðjónsson – Stoke City 2004–06
Aron Gunnarsson – Coventry City, Cardiff City 2008–13, 2014–18
Brynjar Gunnarsson – Reading 2005–06, 2008–12
Patrik Gunnarsson – Brentford 2018–19
Emil Hallfreðsson – Barnsley 2009–10
Heiðar Helguson – Watford, Queens Park Rangers, Cardiff City 2004–05, 2008–11, 2012–13
Hermann Hreiðarsson – Portsmouth, Coventry city 2010–12
Ívar Ingimarsson – Reading, Ipswich Town 2004–06, 2008–12
Eggert Jónsson – Wolverhampton Wanderers, Charlton Athletic 2012–13
Hörður Björgvin Magnússon – Bristol City 2016–18
Björn Sigurðarson – Wolverhampton Wanderers 2012–13, 2015–16
Gylfi Sigurðsson – Reading 2008–11
Hannes Sigurðsson – Stoke City 2005–07
Ragnar Sigurðsson – Fulham 2016–17
Gunnar Heiðar Þorvaldsson – Reading 2009–10

Iran 
Karim Ansarifard – Nottingham Forest 2018–19
Ashkan Dejagah – Nottingham Forest 2017–18
Saeid Ezatolahi – Reading 2018–19
Saman Ghoddos – Brentford 2020–21
Reza Ghoochannejhad – Charlton Athletic 2013–14, 2015–16
Hossein Kaebi – Leicester City 2007–08
Alex Samizadeh – Bolton 2015–16
Allahyar Sayyadmanesh – Hull City 2021–
Andranik Teymourian – Barnsley 2008–09

Iraq 
Yaser Kasim – Brighton & Hove Albion 2011–13
Ameen Al-Dakhil – Burnley 2023–

Israel 
Gai Assulin – Brighton & Hove Albion 2011–12
Tal Ben Haim – Portsmouth, Charlton Athletic 2010–12, 2014–15
Yossi Benayoun – Queens Park Rangers 2013–14
Tomer Hemed – Brighton & Hove Albion, Queens Park Rangers, Charlton Athletic 2015–17, 2018–20
Beram Kayal – Brighton & Hove Albion, Charlton Athletic 2014–17, 2019–20
Dekel Keinan – Cardiff City, Crystal Palace, Bristol City 2010–12
Ben Sahar – Queens Park Rangers, Sheffield Wednesday – 2007–08
Miguel Vítor – Leicester City 2010–11

Italy 
Matteo Alberti – Queens Park Rangers 2008–10
Gabriele Angella – Watford, Queens Park Rangers 2013–16
Mirco Antenucci – Leeds United 2014–16
Cristian Battocchio – Watford 2012–14
Giuseppe Bellusci – Leeds United 2014–16
Tommaso Bianchi – Leeds United 2014–16
Fabio Borini – Swansea City 2010–11
Cesare Casadei – Reading – 2022–
Marco Cassetti – Watford 2012–14
Samuel Di Carmine – Queens Park Rangers 2008–09
Nicolao Dumitru – Nottingham Forest 2016–17
Diego Fabbrini – Watford, Millwall, Birmingham City, Middlesbrough 2013–17
Marco Davide Faraoni – Watford 2013–14
Andrea Ferretti – Cardiff City 2005–06
Fernando Forestieri – Watford, Sheffield Wednesday 2012–20
Emanuele Gabrieli – Sheffield United 2004–05
Pierluigi Gollini – Aston Villa 2016–17
Matteo Lanzoni – Yeovil Town 2013–14
Arturo Lupoli – Derby County, Norwich City, Sheffield United 2006–07, 2008–09
Federico Macheda – Doncaster Rovers, Birmingham City, Cardiff City, Nottingham Forest 2013–16
Vito Mannone – Barnsley, Hull City, Reading 2006–07, 2010–12, 2017–19
Mauro Milanese – Queens Park Rangers 2005–07
Marco Motta – Watford, Charlton 2014–16
Gianni Munari – Watford 2014–15
Alessandro Pellicori – Queens Park Rangers 2009–10
Davide Petrucci – Peterborough United, Charlton Athletic 2012–14
Eros Pisano – Bristol City 2017–19
Francesco Pisano – Bolton Wanderers 2015–16
Generoso Rossi – Queens Park Rangers 2004–05
Luca Scapuzzi – Portsmouth 2011–12
Marco Silvestri – Leeds United 2014–17
Damiano Tommasi – Queens Park Rangers 2008–09
Marcello Trotta – Watford 2011–12

Jamaica 
Rolando Aarons – Newcastle United, Sheffield Wednesday, Huddersfield Town 2016–17, 2018–19, 2021–
Michail Antonio – Reading, Sheffield Wednesday, Nottingham Forest 2009–16
Rodolph Austin – Leeds United 2012–15
Giles Barnes – Derby County, West Bromwich Albion, Doncaster Rovers 2005–07, 2008–10, 2011–12
Marcus Bean – Queens Park Rangers 2004–06
Jermaine Beckford – Leeds United, Leicester City, Huddersfield Town, Bolton Wanderers, Preston North End 2005–07, 2011–17
Amari'i Bell – Birmingham City, Blackburn Rovers, Luton Town 2013–14, 2018–
Trevor Benjamin – Leicester City, Coventry City, Watford 2004–06
Elliott Bennett – Norwich City, Brighton & Hove Albion, Bristol City, Blackburn Rovers 2014–17, 2018–
Deon Burton – Sheffield Wednesday, Charlton Athletic 2005–09
Darren Byfield – Gillingham, Bristol City, Doncaster Rovers 2004–05, 2007–09
Jamal Campbell-Ryce – Rotherham United, Southend United, Barnsley, Bristol City 2004–05, 2006–07, 2007–12
Jordan Cousins – Charlton Athletic, Queens Park Rangers, Stoke City, Wigan Athletic 2013–21, 2022–
Shaun Cummings – West Bromwich Albion, Reading, Millwall F.C. 2009–12, 2013–15
Omar Daley – Preston North End 2004–05
Claude Davis – Preston North End, Derby County, Crystal Palace 2004–06, 2008–11
Simon Dawkins – Derby County 2013–15
Bobby Decordova-Reid – Bristol City, Brentford, Cardiff City, Fulham 2010–11, 2012–13, 2015–18, 2019–20, 2021–
Clayton Donaldson – Birmingham City, Sheffield United, Bolton Wanderers 2014–19
Lloyd Doyley – Watford, Rotherham United 2004–06, 2007–16
Chey Dunkley – Wigan Athletic, Sheffield Wednesday 2018–21
Marvin Elliott – Millwall, Bristol City 2004–06, 2007–13
Jason Euell – Southampton, Blackpool, Doncaster Rovers 2007–11
Damien Francis – Watford 2007–09
Francino Francis – Watford 2005–06
Ricardo Fuller – Preston North End, Southampton, Ipswich Town, Stoke City, Charlton Athletic, Blackpool, Millwall 2004–08, 2012–15
Ricardo Gardner – Preston North End 2010–11
Marcus Gayle – Watford 2004–05
Lewis Grabban – Crystal Palace, Millwall, Bournemouth, Norwich City, Reading, Sunderland, Aston Villa, Nottingham Forest 2006–08, 2010–11, 2013–15, 2016–
Joel Grant – Watford, Yeovil Town 2005–06, 2013–14
Andre Gray – Brentford, Burnley, Watford, Queens Park Rangers 2014–16, 2020–
Wes Harding – Birmingham City, Rotherham United 2017–21, 2022–
Barry Hayles – Sheffield United, Millwall, Plymouth Argyle, Leicester City 2004–08
Michael Hector – Reading, Hull City, Sheffield Wednesday, Fulham 2013–16, 2017–20
Chris Humphrey – Preston North End 2015–17
Micah Hyde – Burnley – 2004–07
Daniel Johnson – Preston North End 2015–
David Johnson – Nottingham Forest, Sheffield United 2004–06
Jermaine Johnson – Sheffield Wednesday 2007–10, 2012–14
Michael Johnson – Derby County, Sheffield Wednesday 2004–08
Marlon King – Nottingham Forest, Leeds United, Watford, Coventry City, Birmingham City 2004–06, 2007–08, 2010–13
Richard Langley – Cardiff City F.C., Queens Park Rangers, Luton Town F.C. 2004–07
Kevin Lisbie – Norwich City, Derby County, Colchester United, Ipswich Town, Millwall 2005–06, 2007–09, 2010–11
Jamal Lowe – Wigan Athletic, Swansea City, Bournemouth, Queens Park Rangers 2019–
Jamar Loza – Norwich City 2014–15
Adrian Mariappa – Watford, Reading, Bristol City 2005–06, 2007–12, 2020–
Tyrone Mears – Preston North End, Derby County, Burnley F.C., Bolton Wanderers, 2004–06, 2007, 2008–09, 2010–11, 2012–14
Jobi McAnuff – West Ham United, Cardiff City, Crystal Palace, Watford, Reading 2004–12, 2013–14
Garath McCleary – Nottingham Forest, Reading, Wycombe Wanderers 2008–12, 2013–21
Darren Moore – Derby County, Barnsley 2005–07, 2008–10
Liam Moore – Leicester City, Brentford, Bristol City, Reading, Stoke City 2011–
Wes Morgan – Nottingham Forest, Leicester City 2003–05, 2008–14
Ravel Morrison – West Ham United, Birmingham City, Queens Park Rangers, Cardiff City, Middlesbrough, Derby County 2011–15, 2016–17, 2019–20, 2021–
Nyron Nosworthy – Gillingham F.C., Sunderland, Sheffield United, Watford, Blackpool – 2004–05, 2006–07, 2009–15
Kasey Palmer – Huddersfield Town, Derby County, Blackburn Rovers, Bristol City, Swansea City 2016–
Demar Phillips – Stoke City 2007–08
Ethan Pinnock – Bristol City, Brentford 2017–18, 2019–21
Darryl Powell – Nottingham Forest 2004–05
Dane Richards – Burnley 2012–13
Theo Robinson – Watford, Millwall, Derby County, Huddersfield Town, Doncaster Rovers 2005–06, 2008–09, 2010–14
 Trevor Robinson – Millwall 2004–06
Kemar Roofe – Leeds United 2016–19
Ricky Sappleton – Leicester City 2007–08
Luton Shelton – Sheffield United 2007–08
Frank Sinclair – Burnley – 2004–07
Damion Stewart – Queens Park Rangers, Bristol City 2006–12
Kevin Stewart – Hull City, Blackpool 2017–20, 2021–
Cleveland Taylor – Scunthorpe United 2007–08
O'Neil Thompson – Barnsley 2009–10
Curtis Tilt - Wigan Athletic - 2022-
Lee Williamson – Watford, Preston North End, Sheffield United, Blackburn Rovers, Burton Albion  2007–11, 2012–17

Japan 
Yuki Abe – Leicester City 2009–12
Junichi Inamoto – Cardiff City West Bromwich Albion, 2004–05, 2006–07
Tadanari Lee – Southampton 2011–12
Yuta Nakayama – Huddersfield Town 2022–

Kazakhstan 
Alexander Merkel – Watford 2013–14

Kenya 
Ayub Masika – Reading 2019–20
Clarke Oduor – Barnsley 2019–

Kosovo 
Bersant Celina – Ipswich Town, Swansea City, Stoke City 2017–20, 2023-
Florent Hadergjonaj – Huddersfield Town 2019–20
Arijanet Muric – Nottingham Forest, Burnley 2019–20, 2022–
Atdhe Nuhiu – Sheffield Wednesday 2013–20
Milot Rashica – Norwich City – 2022–

Latvia 
Aleksandrs Cauņa – Watford 2008–09
Kaspars Gorkšs – Blackpool, Queens Park Rangers, Reading, Wolverhampton Wanderers 2007–14
Vitālijs Maksimenko – Brighton & Hove Albion 2013–14
Marians Pahars – Southampton 2005–06
Andrejs Perepļotkins – Derby County 2008–09
Deniss Rakels – Reading 2015–17

Liberia 
Alex Nimely – Middlesbrough, Coventry City, Crystal Palace 2011–13

Lithuania 
Deimantas Petravičius – Nottingham Forest 2015–16
Andrius Velička – Bristol City 2009–10
Marius Žaliūkas – Leeds United 2013–14

Luxembourg 
Danel Sinani – Huddersfield Town, Norwich City, Wigan Athletic 2021–

Mali 
Mamadou Bagayoko – Doncaster Rovers 2011–12
Kalifa Cissé – Reading, Bristol City, Derby County 2008–12, 2013–14
Ismaila Coulibaly – Sheffield United 2022–
Samba Diakité – Watford 2013–14
Nouha Dicko – Blackpool, Wolverhampton Wanderers, Hull City 2011–13, 2014–20
Tongo Doumbia – Wolverhampton Wanderers 2012–13
Jimmy Kébé – Reading, Leeds United 2008–12, 2013–14
Cheick Keita – Birmingham City 2016–18
Modibo Maïga – Queens Park Rangers 2013–14
Hadi Sacko – Leeds United 2016–18
Bakary Sako – Wolverhampton Wanderers, West Bromwich 2012–13, 2014–15, 2018–19
Mamady Sidibe – Gillingham, Stoke City, Sheffield Wednesday 2004–08, 2012–13
Samba Sow – Nottingham Forest 2019–21
Mohammed Sylla – Leicester City 2005–07
Adama Traoré – Hull City 2022–
Djimi Traoré – Birmingham City 2008–09
Molla Wagué – Nottingham Forest 2018–19

Malta 
Daniel Bogdanovic – Barnsley, Sheffield United 2008–11
Jodi Jones – Coventry City 2021–22
Michael Mifsud – Coventry City, Barnsley 2007–09
Joe Muscatt – Bolton Wanderers 2018–19

Martinique 
Sébastien Carole – Brighton and Hove Albion, Leeds United 2005–07
Julien Faubert – West Ham United 2011–12
Wesley Jobello – Coventry City – 2020–21
Frédéric Piquionne – West Ham United, Doncaster Rovers 2011–12

Mauritania 
Souleymane Doukara – Leeds United 2014–17
Aboubakar Kamara – Fulham – 2017–18, 2019–20, 2021–22

Mauritius 
Kévin Bru – Ipswich Town 2014–18

Mexico 
Pablo Barrera – West Ham United 2011–12
Giovani dos Santos – Ipswich Town 2008–09
Miguel Layún – Watford 2014–15

Montenegro 
Matija Šarkić – Birmingham City, Stoke City 2021–
Simon Vukčević – Blackburn Rovers 2012–13
Elsad Zverotić – Fulham 2014–15

Montserrat 
Brandon Comley – Queens Park Rangers 2016–17
James Comley – Crystal Palace 2008–09
Donervon Daniels – Blackpool, Wigan Athletic 2014–15, 2016–17
Bruce Dyer – Watford, Stoke City, Millwall, Sheffield United 2004–06
Dean Morgan – Reading, Luton Town 2004–07
Lyle Taylor – Charlton Athletic, Nottingham Forest, Birmingham City 2019–22

Morocco 
Amine Bassi – Barnsley 2021–
Zakarya Bergdich – Charlton 2015–16
Ilias Chair – Queens Park Rangers 2017–
Marouane Chamakh – Cardiff City 2016–17
Adil Chihi – Fulham 2014–15
Mounir El Hamdaoui – Derby County 2005–06
Faysal El Idrissi – Coventry City 2006–07
Zakaria Labyad – Fulham 2015–16
Achraf Lazaar – Newcastle United, Sheffield Wednesday, Watford 2016–17, 2018–19, 2020–21
Imran Louza – Watford 2022–
Adam Masina – Watford 2020–21
Youssef Safri – Norwich City, Southampton 2004–08
Romain Saïss – Wolverhampton Wanderers 2016–18
Adel Taarabt – Queens Park Rangers 2008–11
Anass Zaroury – Burnley 2022–
Merouane Zemmama – Middlesbrough 2010–13

Mozambique 
Armando Sá – Leeds United 2006–07

Namibia 
Ryan Nyambe – Blackburn Rovers, Wigan Athletic 2016–17, 2018–

Netherlands 
Nathan Aké – Reading 2014–15
Pim Balkestein – Ipswich Town 2008–10
Nacer Barazite – Derby County 2008–09
Roy Beerens – Reading 2016–18
George Boateng – Nottingham Forest 2011–12
Ferrie Bodde – Swansea City 2008–11
Jeffrey Bruma – Leicester City 2010–11
Marciano Bruma – Barnsley 2007–09
Ellery Cairo – Coventry City 2007–08
Tahith Chong – Birmingham City 2021–
Pelle Clement – Reading 2017–18
Jurgen Colin – Norwich City 2005–07
Arnaut Danjuma – Bournemouth 2020–21
Chris David – Fulham 2014–15
Edgar Davids – Crystal Palace 2010–11
Marten de Roon – Middlesbrough 2017–18
Ed de Goey – Stoke City 2004–06
Dorus de Vries – Swansea City, Wolverhampton Wanderers, Nottingham Forest 2008–11, 2012–17
Mark de Vries – Leicester City 2005–07
Jordy de Wijs – Hull City, Queens Park Rangers 2018–
Arjan De Zeeuw – Coventry City 2007–08
Mitchell Dijks – Norwich City 2016–17
Anfernee Dijksteel – Charlton Athletic, Middlesbrough 2019–
Royston Drenthe – Reading, Sheffield Wednesday 2013–15
Kyle Ebecilio – Nottingham Forest 2015–16
Carel Eiting – Huddersfield Town 2020–22
Anwar El Ghazi – Aston Villa 2018–19
Abdenasser El Khayati – Queens Park Rangers – 2015–17
Urby Emanuelson – Sheffield Wednesday 2016–17
Marvin Emnes – Middlesbrough, Swansea City, Blackburn Rovers 2009–14, 2016–17
Etienne Esajas – Sheffield Wednesday 2007–10
Juan Familia-Castillo – Birmingham City 2021–22
Leroy Fer – Norwich City, Queens Park Rangers, Swansea City 2014–16, 2018–19
Zian Flemming – Millwall 2022–
Jimmy Floyd Hasselbaink – Cardiff City 2007–08
Paul Gladon – Wolverhampton Wanderers 2016–17
Danzell Gravenberch – Reading 2016–17
Jay-Roy Grot – Leeds United 2017–18
Gustavo Hamer – Coventry City 2020–
Wesley Hoedt – Watford – 2022–
Ki-Jana Hoever – Stoke City 2022–
Danny Holla – Brighton & Hove Albion 2014–16
Jos Hooiveld – Southampton, Norwich City, Millwall 2011–12, 2014–15
Lex Immers – Cardiff City 2015–17
Daryl Janmaat – Newcastle United 2016–17
Collins John – Leicester City, Watford 2007–08
Ola John – Reading, Wolverhampton Wanderers 2015–17
Maikel Kieftenbeld – Birmingham City, Millwall 2015–
Terence Kongolo – Huddersfield Town, Fulham 2019–20
Tim Krul – Newcastle United, Norwich City 2009–10, 2018–19, 2020–21, 2022–
Michel Kuipers – Brighton & Hove Albion 2004–05
Michael Lamey – Leicester City 2010–11
Glenn Loovens – Cardiff City, Sheffield Wednesday 2005–09, 2013–18
Ian Maatsen – Coventry City, Burnley 2021–
Sherjill MacDonald – West Bromwich Albion 2007–08
Bruno Martins Indi – Stoke City 2018–21
Erwin Mulder – Swansea City 2018–20
Luciano Narsingh – Swansea City 2018–19
Joey Pelupessy – Sheffield Wednesday 2017–21
Erik Pieters – Stoke City 2018–19
Joël Piroe – Swansea City 2021–
Stefan Postma – Wolverhampton Wanderers 2005–06
Berry Powell – Millwall 2005–06
Iwan Redan – Cardiff City 2006–07
Karim Rekik – Portsmouth, Blackburn Rovers 2011–13
Maceo Rigters – Norwich City, Barnsley 2007–09
Kelle Roos – Rotherham United, Derby County 2015–16, 2018–
Robbin Ruiter – Sunderland 2017–18
Jan-Paul Saeijs – Southampton 2008–09
Marcel Seip – Plymouth Argyle, Blackpool, Sheffield United 2006–10
Andwélé Slory – West Bromwich Albion 2009–10
Evander Sno – Bristol City 2009–10
Pascal Struijk – Leeds United 2019–20
Mike te Wierik – Derby County 2020–
Dwight Tiendalli – Middlesbrough 2014–15
Patrick van Aanholt – Coventry City, Newcastle United, Leicester City 2009–11
Joost van Aken – Sheffield Wednesday 2017–19, 2020–21
Joey van den Berg – Reading 2016–18
Sepp van den Berg – Preston North End 2020–
Cedric van der Gun – Swansea City 2009–11
Mike van der Hoorn – Swansea City 2018–20
Jan Paul van Hecke – Blackburn Rovers 2021–
Rajiv van La Parra – Wolverhampton Wanders, Brighton & Hove Albion, Huddersfield Town, Middlesbrough 2014–17, 2018–20
Jos van Nieuwstadt – Doncaster Rovers 2008–09
Remco van der Schaaf – Burnley 2008–09
Lars Veldwijk – Nottingham Forest 2014–15
Michael Verrips – Sheffield United 2021–22
Kenny Tete – Fulham 2021–
Yanic Wildschut – Middlesbrough, Wigan Athletic, Norwich City, Cardiff City, Bolton Wanderers 2014–19
Marvin Zeegelaar – Blackpool 2013–14
Deyovaisio Zeefuik – Blackburn Rovers 2021–
Gianni Zuiverloon – West Bromwich Albion, Ipswich Town 2009–11

New Zealand 

Henry Cameron – Blackpool 2014–15
Rory Fallon – Plymouth Argyle, Ipswich Town 2006–11 
Cameron Howieson – Burnley 2011–12
Chris Killen – Norwich City, Middlesbrough 2008–10
Stefan Marinovic – Bristol City 2018–19
Winston Reid – West Ham United, Brentford 2011–12, 2020–21 
Tommy Smith – Ipswich Town 2008–18
Chris Wood – West Bromwich Albion, Barnsley, Birmingham City, Bristol City, Millwall, Leicester City, Ipswich Town, Leeds United 2009–17

Nigeria 
Dele Adebola – Coventry City, Bristol City, Nottingham Forest, Hull City 2004–12
Victor Adeboyejo – Barnsley 2020–22
Ola Aina – Hull City 2017–18
Semi Ajayi – Rotherham United, West Bromwich Albion – 2016–17, 2018–20, 2021–
Ade Akinbiyi – Stoke City, Burnley 2004–06, 2007–09
Hope Akpan – Hull City, Reading, Blackburn Rovers, Burton Albion – 2010–11, 2013–18
Sone Aluko – Blackpool, Hull City, Fulham, Reading 2008–09, 2012–13, 2015–21
Sammy Ameobi – Middlesbrough, Cardiff City, Newcastle United, Bolton Wanderers 2012–13, 2015–19
Shola Ameobi – Stoke City, Newcastle United, Bolton Wanderers 2007–08, 2009–10, 2015–16
Joe Aribo – Charlton Athletic 2015–16
Leon Balogun – Wigan Athletic 2019–20
Jamilu Collins – Cardiff City 2022–
Fisayo Dele-Bashiru – Sheffield Wednesday 2020–21
Tom Dele-Bashiru – Watford, Reading 2020–
Emmanuel Dennis – Watford 2022–23
Bright Enobakhare – Wolverhampton Wanders, Wigan Athletic 2015–18, 2019–20
Oghenekaro Etebo – Stoke City 2018–20
Dickson Etuhu – Blackburn Rovers 2012–14
Kelvin Etuhu – Leicester City, Cardiff City, Portsmouth, Barnsley 2007–08, 2009–10, 2011–14
Odion Ighalo – Watford 2014–15
Carl Ikeme – Wolverhampton Wanderers, Sheffield United, Queens Park Rangers, Leicester City, Middlesbrough, Doncaster Rovers  2006–07, 2008–13, 2014–17
Blessing Kaku – Derby County 2004–05
Samuel Kalu – Watford 2022–
Nwankwo Kanu – Portsmouth 2010–12
David Kasumu - Huddersfield Town - 2022-
Ademola Lookman – Charlton Athletic 2015–16
Josh Maja – Sunderland, Stoke City 2017–18, 2021–22
Victor Moses – Crystal Palace 2007–10
Mikel John Obi – Middlesbrough, Stoke City 2018–19, 2020–21
Eric Obinna Chukwunyelu – Reading 2005–06
Kayode Odejayi – Barnsley 2007–10
Peter Odemwingie – Bristol City, Rotherham United 2015–17
Nnamdi Ofoborh – Bournemouth, Wycombe Wanderers 2020–21
Bartholomew Ogbeche – Middlesbrough 2011–12
Jay-Jay Okocha – Hull City 2007–08
Michael Olise – Reading 2018–21
Egutu Oliseh – Queens Park Rangers 2006–07
Seyi Olofinjana – Wolverhampton Wanderers, Cardiff City, Hull City, Sheffield Wednesday 2004–08, 2010–13
Kenneth Omeruo – Middlesbrough 2013–15
Fred Onyedinma – Millwall, Wycombe Wanderers, Luton Town 2013–15, 2017–19, 2020–
Bright Osayi-Samuel – Blackpool, Queens Park Rangers 2014–15, 2017–21
Danny Shittu – Queens Park Rangers, Watford, Millwall 2004–06, 2007–08, 2010–11 2012–14
Enoch Showunmi – Luton, Bristol City, Sheffield Wednesday, 2005–06, 2007–08
Efe Sodje – Southend United 2006–07
Onome Sodje – Barnsley 2009–10
Sam Sodje – West Bromwich Albion, Charlton Athletic, Watford – 2006–09
Viv Solomon-Otabor – Birmingham City 2015–17, 2018–19
Isaac Success – Watford 2020–21
Solomon Taiwo – Cardiff City 2009–10, 2011–12
William Troost-Ekong – Watford 2020–21, 2022–
Ugo Ukah – Queens Park Rangers 2005–06
John Utaka – Portsmouth 2010–11
Taribo West – Plymouth Argyle 2005–06
Yakubu – Leicester City, Reading 2010–11, 2014–15

North Macedonia 
Ezgjan Alioski – Leeds United 2017–20
Darko Churlinov – Burnley 2022–
Dejan Stojanović – Middlesbrough 2019–20
Veliče Šumulikoski – Ipswich Town, Preston North End 2008–10

Norway 
Thelo Aasgaard – Wigan Athletic 2022–
Torbjørn Agdestein – Brighton & Hove Albion 2011–13
Eirik Bakke – Leeds United 2004–06
Sander Berge – Sheffield United 2021–
John Carew – West Ham United 2011–12
Adama Diomande – Hull City 2015–16, 2017–18
Magnus Wolff Eikrem – Cardiff City 2014–15
Tore André Flo – Leeds United 2006–07
Markus Henriksen – Hull City, Bristol City 2017–20
Jon-Olav Hjelde – Nottingham Forest 2004–05
Leo Hjelde – Rotherham United 2022–
Erik Huseklepp – Portsmouth, Birmingham City 2011–12
Abdisalam Ibrahim – Scunthorpe United 2010–11
Steffen Iversen – Crystal Palace 2010–12
Stefan Johansen – Fulham, West Bromwich, Queens Park Rangers 2016–
Christian Kalvenes – Burnley 2008–09
Joshua King – Preston North End, Hull City, Blackburn Rovers, Bournemouth 2010–15, 2020–21
Rocky Lekaj – Sheffield Wednesday 2007–09
Claus Lundekvam – Southampton 2005–07
Mats Møller Dæhli – Cardiff City 2014–15
Thomas Myhre – Sunderland 2004–05
Ørjan Nyland – Aston Villa, Bournemouth, Reading 2018–19, 2021–22
Leo Skiri Østigård – Coventry City, Stoke City 2020–22
Jonathan Parr – Crystal Palace, Ipswich Town 2011–13, 2014–16
Marcus Pedersen – Barnsley 2013–14
Morten Gamst Pedersen – Blackburn Rovers 2012–13
Bjørn Helge Riise – Sheffield United, Portsmouth 2010–12
Thomas Rogne – Wigan Athletic 2013–14
Martin Samuelsen – Blackburn Rovers, Burton Albion, Hull City 2016–18, 2019–20
Vemund Brekke Skard – Ipswich Town 2005–06
Jo Tessem – Millwall 2004–05
Alexander Tettey – Norwich City 2014–15, 2016–19, 2020–21
Erik Tønne – Sheffield United 2010–11
Fredrik Ulvestad – Burnley 2015–16
Petter Vaagan Moen – Queens Park Rangers 2010–11

Oman 
Ali Al-Habsi – Wigan Athletic, Brighton & Hove Albion, Reading 2013–17

Pakistan 
Zesh Rehman – Norwich City, Queens Park Rangers, Blackpool 2005–09

Paraguay 
Javier Acuña – Watford 2013–14
Brian Montenegro – Leeds United 2014–15
Braian Ojeda – Nottingham Forest 2021–

Peru 
Cristian Benavente – Milton Keynes Dons 2015–16
Paolo Hurtado – Reading 2015–16
Miguel Mostto – Barnsley 2008–09
Diego Penny – Burnley 2008–09
Nolberto Solano – Leicester City, Hull City 2009–11

Philippines 
Neil Etheridge – Charlton, Cardiff City, Birmingham City 2014–15, 2017–18, 2019–

Poland 
Bartosz Bialkowski – Southampton, Barnsley, Ipswich Town, Millwall 2006–10, 2011–12, 2014–
Krystian Bielik – Birmingham City, Derby County 2016–17, 2019–22
Mateusz Bogusz – Leeds United 2017–20
Ariel Borysiuk – Queens Park Rangers 2016–17
Artur Boruc – Bournemouth 2014–15
Matty Cash – Nottingham Forest 2016–20
Bartosz Cybulski– Derby County 2021–
Tomasz Cywka – Derby County, Reading, Barnsley, Blackpool 2009–15
 Adam Czerkas – Queens Park Rangers 2006–07
Dariusz Dudka – Birmingham City 2013–14
Tomasz Frankowski – Wolverhampton Wanderers 2005–06
Kamil Grabara – Huddersfield Town 2019–20
Kamil Grosicki – Hull City, West Bromwich Albion 2017–20
Tomasz Hajto – Southampton, Derby County 2005–06
Michał Helik – Barnsley 2020–
Kamil Jóźwiak – Derby County 2020–
Przemysław Kaźmierczak – Derby County 2008–09
Mateusz Klich – Leeds United 2017–20
Kamil Kosowski – Southampton 2005–06
Artur Krysiak – Swansea City 2008–09
Marcin Kuś – Queens Park Rangers 2005–06
Tomasz Kuszczak – Watford, Brighton & Hove Albion, Wolverhampton Wanderers, Birmingham City 2011–19
Radosław Majewski – Nottingham Forest, Huddersfield Town 2009–15
Piotr Malarczyk – Ipswich Town 2015–16
Paweł Olkowski – Bolton Wanderers 2018–19
Piotr Parzyszek – Charlton Athletic 2013–14
Damien Perquis – Nottingham Forest 2016–17
Sławomir Peszko – Wolverhampton Wanderers 2012–13
Przemysław Płacheta – Norwich City, Birmingham City 2020–21, 2022-
Grzegorz Rasiak – Derby County, Southampton, Watford, Reading 2004–05, 2006–10
Marek Saganowski – Southampton 2006–09
Grzegorz Sandomierski – Blackburn Rovers 2012–13
Bartosz Ślusarski – West Bromwich Albion, Blackpool, Sheffield Wednesday 2007–09
Marcin Wasilewski – Leicester City 2013–14
Paweł Wszołek – Queens Park Rangers 2016–19
Michał Żyro – Wolverhampton Wanderers 2015–17

Portugal 
Bruno Andrade – Queens Park Rangers 2010–11
Henrique Araújo – Watford 2022–
Betinho – Brentford 2014–15
Cafú – Nottingham Forest 2020–
João Carvalho – Nottingham Forest 2018–20, 2021–22
Joel Castro Pereira – Huddersfield Town 2020–21
Quévin Castro – West Bromwich Albion – 2021–
Ivan Cavaleiro – Wolverhampton Wanderers, Fulham 2016–18, 2019–20, 2021–
Gil Dias – Nottingham Forest 2018–19
Tomás Esteves – Reading 2020–21
Carlos Fangueiro – Millwall 2005–06
João Ferreira – Watford 2022–
Tobias Figueiredo – Nottingham Forest, Hull City – 2017–
Rafael Floro – Sheffield Wednesday 2013–14
José Fonte – Crystal Palace, Southampton 2007–10, 2011–12
Rui Fonte – Crystal Palace, Fulham 2008–09, 2017–18
Nuno Gomes – Blackburn Rovers 2012–13
Tiago Gomes – Blackpool 2012–13
Diogo Gonçalves – Nottingham Forest 2018–19
Tiago Ilori – Reading 2016–19
Paulo Jorge– Blackburn Rovers 2012–13
Diogo Jota – Wolverhampton Wanderers 2017–18
Edinho Júnior – Blackburn Rovers 2012–13
Licá – Nottingham Forest 2016–17
Leonardo Lopes – Wigan, Hull City 2018–20
Marco Matias – Sheffield Wednesday 2015–19
Filipe Melo – Sheffield Wednesday 2015–16
Nuno Mendes – Plymouth Argyle 2005–06
Roderick Miranda – Wolverhampton Wanderers 2017–18
Filipe Morais – Bolton Wanderers 2017–18
Moreno – Leicester City 2010–11
Rúben Neves – Wolverhampton Wanderers 2017–18
Fábio Nunes – Blackburn Rovers 2012–14
Filipe Oliveira – Preston North End 2004–05
Nélson Oliveira – Nottingham Forest, Norwich City, Reading 2015–19
Hildeberto Pereira – Nottingham Forest 2016–17
Pedro Pereira – Bristol City 2019–20
Ivo Pinto – Norwich City 2016–19
Domingos Quina – Watford, Fulham, Barnsley 2020–
Yuri Ribeiro – Nottingham Forest 2019–21
Ricardo – Leicester City 2010–11
Ricardo Rocha – Portsmouth 2010–12
Rochinha – Bolton Wanderers 2014–15
Diogo Rosado – Blackburn Rovers 2012–13
Orlando Sá – Reading 2015–16
José Semedo – Charlton Athletic, Sheffield Wednesday 2007–09, 2012–17
Tiago Silva – Nottingham Forest 2019–20
Xande Silva – Nottingham Forest 2021–
Sílvio – Wolverhampton Wanderers 2016–17
Rafa Soares – Fulham 2017–18
Fábio Tavares – Coventry City 2021–
Filipe Teixeira – West Bromwich Albion, Barnsley 2007–08, 2009–10
João Teixeira – Wolverhampton Wanderers 2016–17
João Carlos Teixeira – Brighton & Hove Albion 2014–15
Jorge Teixeira – Charlton 2015–17
Miguel Tininho – West Bromwich Albion, Barnsley 2007–08
Ricardo Vaz Tê – Hull City, Barnsley, West Ham United, Charlton Athletic 2006–07, 2011–12, 2015–16
Frederico Venâncio – Sheffield Wednesday 2017–18
Rúben Vinagre – Wolverhampton Wanderers 2017–18
João Virgínia – Reading 2019–20

Romania 
Sergiu Buș – Sheffield Wednesday 2014–15
Alex Dobre – Wigan Athletic 2019–20
Ionel Ganea – Wolverhampton Wanderers 2005–06
Ștefan Iovan – Brighton & Hove Albion 1990–92
Costel Pantilimon – Nottingham Forest 2017–19
Adrian Popa – Reading 2016–19
George Pușcaș – Reading 2019–
Gabriel Tamaș – West Bromwich Albion, Doncaster Rovers, Watford, Cardiff 2009–10, 2013–16
George Țucudean – Charlton Athletic 2014–15

Russia 
Pavel Pogrebnyak – Reading 2013–15

Saint Kitts and Nevis 
Febian Brandy – Swansea City, Rotherham United 2008–09, 2014–15
Rowan Liburd – Reading 2015–16
Harry Panayiotou – Leicester City 2011–12
Romaine Sawyers – Brentford, West Bromwich Albion, Stoke City, Cardiff City 2016–20, 2021–

Saint Lucia  

Janoi Donacien – Ipswich Town 2018–19

Senegal 
Habib Beye – Doncaster Rovers 2011–12
Papa Bouba Diop – West Ham United, Birmingham City 2011–13
Henri Camara – Sheffield United 2009–10
Bambo Diaby – Barnsley, Preston North End 2019–20, 2021–
Famara Diédhiou – Bristol City 2017–21
Mohamed Diamé – Hull City, Newcastle United 2015–17
Salif Diao – Stoke City 2006–08
Lamine Diatta – Doncaster Rovers 2011–12
Seny Dieng – Queens Park Rangers 2020–
El-Hadji Diouf – Doncaster Rovers, Leeds United 2011–14
Mame Biram Diouf – Stoke City 2018–20
Khalilou Fadiga – Derby County, Coventry City 2005–07
Abdoulaye Faye – West Ham United, Hull City 2011–13
Amdy Faye – Charlton Athletic, Leeds United 2007–08, 2010–11
Morgaro Gomis – Birmingham City 2011–13
Magaye Gueye – Millwall 2014–15
Diomansy Kamara – West Bromwich Albion, Leicester City 2006–07, 2010–11
Mamadou Loum – Reading 2022–
Amadou Salif Mbengue – Reading 2022–
Guirane N'Daw – Birmingham City, Ipswich Town 2011–13
Alfred N'Diaye – Wolverhampton Wanderers 2017–18
Cheikh N'Doye – Birmingham City 2017–19
Pape Alioune Ndiaye – Stoke City 2018–20
Ismaïla Sarr – Watford 2020–21, 2022–
Mouhamadou-Naby Sarr – Charlton, Huddersfield Town 2015–16, 2019–
Iliman Ndiaye – Sheffield United 2021–
Mamadou Seck – Scunthorpe United 2007–08
Abdallah Sima – Stoke City 2021–22
Ibrahima Sonko – Reading, Portsmouth, Ipswich Town 2004–06, 2010–12
Modou Sougou – Sheffield Wednesday – 2015–16
Mickaël Tavares – Middlesbrough 2010–11
Mamadou Thiam – Barnsley 2017–18, 2019–20
Armand Traoré – Queens Park Rangers 2013–14

Serbia 
Marko Dmitrović – Charlton 2014–15
Marko Grujić – Cardiff City – 2017–18
Goran Lovre – Barnsley 2010–11
David Milinković – Hull City 2018–19
Aleksandar Mitrović – Newcastle United, Fulham 2016–18, 2019–20, 2021–
Dejan Stefanović – Norwich City 2008–09
Vladimir Stojković – Nottingham Forest 2016–17
Dejan Tetek – Reading 2020–
Duško Tošić – Queens Park Rangers 2009–10
Miloš Veljković – Middlesbrough, Charlton 2014–16
Nikola Žigić – Birmingham City 2011–15

Seychelles  
 Kevin Betsy – Bristol City 2007–08

Sierra Leone 
Amadou Bakayoko – Coventry City 2020–21
Al Bangura – Watford, Blackpool 2004–07, 2008–10
Steven Caulker – Bristol City, Queens Park Rangers, Wigan Athletic 2010–11, 2016–18, 2022–
Mustapha Dumbuya – Doncaster Rovers 2009–12
Sullay Kaikai – Blackpool 2016–17
Osman Kakay – Queens Park Rangers 2016–
Kei Kamara – Middlesbrough 2013–14
Malvin Kamara – Cardiff 2006–07
Mohamed Kamara – Bolton Wanderers 2012–15
Idris Kanu – Peterborough United 2021–

Slovakia 
Peter Brezovan – Brighton & Hove Albion 2011–14
Marek Čech – West Bromwich Albion 2009–10
Ján Greguš – Bolton Wanderers 2012–13
Filip Kiss – Cardiff City 2011–13
Milan Lalkovič – Doncaster Rovers 2011–12
Marko Maroši – Coventry City 2020–
Ľubomír Michalík – Leeds United 2006–07
Marek Rodák – Rotherham United, Fulham 2018–20, 2021–
Albert Rusnák – Birmingham City 2013–14
Peter Štyvar – Bristol City 2008–09
Pavol Šuhaj – Crewe Alexandra 2005–06
Stanislav Varga – Sunderland, Burnley 2006–08

Slovenia 
Žan Benedičič – Leeds United 2014–15
Boštjan Cesar – West Bromwich Albion 2007–08
Jon Gorenc Stanković – Huddersfield Town 2016–17, 2019–20
Bojan Jokić – Nottingham Forest 2015–16
Robert Koren – West Bromwich Albion, Hull City 2007–08, 2009–13
Jan Mlakar – Queens Park Rangers, Wigan Athletic 2019–20
Nejc Pečnik – Sheffield Wednesday 2012–13
 Andraž Šporar – Middlesbrough – 2021–
Jure Travner – Reading 2014–15
Etien Velikonja – Cardiff City 2012–13
Haris Vučkić – Newcastle United, Cardiff City 2009–10, 2011–12

South Africa 
Kagisho Dikgacoi – Crystal Palace, Cardiff City 2010–13, 2014–16
Mark Fish – Ipswich Town 2005–06
Quinton Fortune – Doncaster Rovers 2009–10
Lyle Foster – Burnley – 2022–
Dean Furman – Doncaster Rovers 2013–14
Bongani Khumalo – Reading, Doncaster Rovers 2011–12, 2013–14
Aaron Mokoena – Portsmouth 2010–12
Kamohelo Mokotjo – Brentford 2017–20
Kgosi Ntlhe – Peterborough United 2011–13
Matty Pattison – Norwich City 2007–08
Lucas Radebe – Leeds United 2004–05
Tokelo Rantie – Bournemouth 2013–15
Bally Smart – Norwich City 2006–07
Davide Somma – Leeds United 2010–13
Lars Veldwijk – Nottingham Forest 2014–15, 2016–17

South Korea 
Lee Chung-yong – Bolton Wanderers 2012–15
Kim Bo-kyung – Cardiff City 2012–13
Park Chu-young – Watford 2013–14
Kim Do-heon – West Bromwich Albion 2007–08
Seol Ki-hyeon – Wolverhampton Wanderers 2004–06
Yun Suk-young – Queens Park Rangers, Doncaster Rovers, Charlton Athletic 2013–14, 2015–16

Spain 
Raúl Albentosa – Derby County 2014–15
Manuel Almunia – West Ham United, Watford 2011–14
Marcos Alonso – Bolton Wanderers 2012–13
Daniel Ayala – Hull City, Derby County, Nottingham Forest, Middlesbrough, Blackburn Rovers 2010–11, 2012–16, 2017–
Borja Bastón – Swansea City 2019–20
Guillem Bauzà – Swansea City 2008–10
Héctor Bellerín – Watford 2013–14
Alberto Bueno – Derby County 2010–11
Bruno – Brighton & Hove Albion 2012–17
Cala – Cardiff City 2014–15
Iñigo Calderón – Brighton & Hove Albion 2011–16
Iván Calero – Derby County 2014–15
Iván Campo – Ipswich Town 2008–09
Sergi Canós – Brentford, Norwich City 2015–21
José Manuel Casado – Bolton Wanderers 2015–16
Kiko Casilla – Leeds United 2018–20
Cristian Ceballos – Charlton 2015–16
Chema – Nottingham Forest 2019–20
Adrián Colunga – Brighton & Hove Albion 2014–15
Pablo Couñago – Ipswich Town, Crystal Palace 2007–11
Carlos Cuéllar – Norwich City 2014–15
Damià – Middlesbrough 2014–15
Marc de Val – Doncaster Rovers 2013–14
Derik – Bolton Wanderers 2015–16, 2017–18
Hugo Díaz – Leeds United 2017–18
José Enrique – Newcastle United 2009–10
Iago Falque – Southampton 2011–12
Kiko Femenía – Watford 2020–21
Álex Fernández – Reading 2015–16
Álvaro Fernández - Preston North End - 2022-
Miguel Fernández – Birmingham City 2019–
Juan Rafael Fuentes – Nottingham Forest 2017–18
Jesús Gámez – Newcastle United 2016–17
Javier Garrido – Norwich City 2014–15
Mario Gaspar - Watford - 2022-
Alexandre Geijo – Watford 2012–13
Álvaro Giménez – Birmingham City 2019–20
Jordi Gómez – Swansea City, Wigan Athletic, Blackburn Rovers 2008–09, 2013–14, 2015–17
Esteban Granero – Queens Park Rangers 2013–14
Javi Guerra – Cardiff City 2014–15
Miguel Ángel Guerrero – Nottingham Forest 2020–21
Pablo Hernández – Leeds United 2016–20
Pablo Ibáñez – Birmingham City 2011–13
Iñigo Idiakez – Derby County, Southampton, Queens Park Rangers 2004–08
Jota – Brentford, Birmingham City 2014–19
Jozabed – Fulham 2016–17
Kike – Middlesbrough 2014–16
Bojan Krkić – Stoke City 2018–19
Diego León – Barnsley 2007–09
Miguel Llera – Blackpool, Sheffield Wednesday 2011–14
Álex López – Sheffield Wednesday 2015–16
Cristian López – Huddersfield Town 2013–14
David López – Brighton & Hove Albion 2012–14
Jordi López – Queens Park Rangers, Swansea City 2008–11
Ángel Martínez – Blackpool, Millwall 2011–15
Omar Mascarell – Derby County 2014–15
Agus Medina – Birmingham City 2019–20
Tomás Mejías – Middlesbrough 2013–15
Carlos Mendes Gomes – Luton Town 2021–
Ignasi Miquel – Leicester City 2013–14
Rafa Mir – Wolverhampton Wanderers, Nottingham Forest 2017–18, 2019–20
Marc Navarro – Watford 2020–21
Alberto Noguera – Blackpool 2012–13
Charles Ondo – Huddersfield Town 2022–
Edu Oriol – Blackpool 2014–15
Joan Oriol – Blackpool 2014–15
Andrea Orlandi – Swansea City, Brighton & Hove Albion, Blackpool 2008–11, 2012–15
Dani Pacheco – Norwich City 2010–11
Rubén Palazuelos – Yeovil Town 2013–14
Dani Parejo – Queens Park Rangers 2008–09
Alfonso Pedraza – Leeds United 2016–17
Ayoze Pérez – Newcastle United 2016–17
Dani Pinillos – Nottingham Forest, Barnsley 2016–18, 2019–20
Gorka Pintado – Swansea City 2008–10
Pipa – Huddersfield Town 2020–22
Maurizio Pochettino – Watford 2020–21
Xavi Quintillà – Norwich City 2020–21
Iván Ramis – Wigan Athletic 2013–15
Àngel Rangel – Swansea City, Queens Park Rangers 2008–11, 2018–20
David Raya – Blackburn Rovers, Brentford 2014–17, 2019–21
Diego Rico – Bournemouth – 2020–21
Albert Riera – Watford 2013–14
Arnau Riera – Sunderland, Southend United 2006–07
Oriol Riera – Wigan Athletic 2014–15
Rodrigo Riquelme – Bournemouth 2020–21
Rubén Rochina – Blackburn Rovers 2012–14
Rodri – Sheffield Wednesday, Bristol City 2012–13, 2019–20
David Rodríguez Sánchez – Brighton & Hove Albion 2013–14
Samuel Sáiz – Leeds United 2017–19
Mikel San José – Birmingham City 2020–21
Iván Sánchez – Birmingham City 2020–22
Albert Serrán – Swansea City 2008–11
Sito – Ipswich Town 2005–08
Kike Sola – Middlesbrough 2015–16
Marcos Tébar – Brentford 2014–15
Jon Toral – Brentford, Birmingham City, Hull City 2014–16, 2017–21
Adama Traoré – Aston Villa, Middlesbrough 2016–18
Juan Ugarte – Crewe Alexandra 2005–06
Borja Valero – West Bromwich Albion 2009–10
Álex Vallejo – Huddersfield Town 2020–22
Juan Velasco – Norwich City 2007–08
Vicente – Brighton & Hove Albion 2011–13
Fran Villalba – Birmingham City 2019–20
Xisco – Newcastle United 2009–10

Sudan  
Mohamed Eisa – Bristol City 2018–19

Suriname 
Tjaronn Chery – Queens Park Rangers 2015–17
Florian Jozefzoon – Brentford, Derby County, Rotherham United 2016–21
Kenneth Paal – Queens Park Rangers 2022–
Fabian Wilnis – Ipswich Town 2004–08

Sweden 
Marcus Antonsson – Leeds United 2016–17
Joel Asoro – Sunderland, Swansea City 2017–19
Joachim Björklund – Wolverhampton Wanderers 2004–05
Paweł Cibicki – Leeds United 2017–18
Bojan Djordjic – Sheffield Wednesday, Plymouth Argyle 2001–02, 2005–07
Hjalmar Ekdal – Burnley – 2022–
Joel Ekstrand – Watford, Bristol City, Rotherham United 2012–15, 2016–17
Niclas Eliasson – Bristol City 2017–20
Gustav Engvall – Bristol City 2016–18
Patrik Gerrbrand – Leicester City 2005–06
John Guidetti – Burnley 2010–11
Viktor Gyökeres – Swansea City, Coventry City 2020–
Markus Holgersson – Wigan Athletic 2013–14
Tobias Hysén – Sunderland 2006–07
Pontus Jansson – Leeds United, Brentford 2016–21
Andreas Johansson – Wigan Athletic 2004–05
Nils-Eric Johansson – Leicester City 2005–07
Viktor Johansson – Rotherham United 2020–21, 2022–
Alexander Kačaniklić – Watford, Burnley, Fulham 2011–13, 2014–15
Sebastian Larsson – Birmingham City, Hull City 2006–07, 2008–09, 2017–18
Alexander Milošević – Nottingham Forest 2018–19
Kerim Mrabti – Birmingham City 2018–20
Kristoffer Nordfeldt – Swansea City 2018–19
Robin Olsen – Sheffield United 2021–22
Jonas Olsson – West Bromwich Albion 2009–10
Marcus Olsson – Blackburn Rovers, Derby County 2012–19
Martin Olsson – Blackburn Rovers, Norwich City, Swansea City 2012–13, 2014–15, 2016–17, 2018–19
Alexander Östlund – Southampton 2005–08
Kristoffer Peterson – Swansea City 2019–20
Mathias Ranégie – Watford, Millwall 2013–15
Björn Runström – Luton Town 2006–07
Ken Sema – Watford 2020–21, 2022–
Rami Shaaban – Brighton & Hove Albion 2004–05
Fredrik Stoor – Derby County 2009–10
Michael Svensson – Southampton 2005–09

Switzerland 
Almen Abdi – Watford, Sheffield Wednesday 2012–15, 2016–18
Gaetano Berardi – Leeds United 2014–20
Bruno Berner – Leicester City 2009–12
Gelson Fernandes – Leicester City 2011–12
Eldin Jakupović – Hull City 2012–13, 2015–16
Pajtim Kasami – Nottingham Forest 2016–17
Timm Klose – Norwich City, Bristol City 2016–19, 2021–
Maheta Molango – Brighton & Hove Albion 2004–05
Andelko Savić – Sheffield Wednesday 2013–14
Kay Voser – Fulham 2014–15
Pascal Zuberbühler – West Bromwich Albion 2006–07

Togo 

Floyd Ayité – Fulham 2016–18, 2019–20
Razak Boukari – Wolverhampton Wanderers 2012–13
Yoann Folly – Nottingham Forest, Southampton, Preston North End, Sheffield Wednesday, Plymouth Argyle 2004–10
Gilles Sunu – Derby County 2009–10

Trinidad and Tobago 
Chris Birchall – Coventry City 2006–09
John Bostock – Crystal Palace, Hull City, Nottingham Forest – 2007–08, 2010–11, 2019–20
Daniel Carr – Huddersfield Town 2013–14
Ian Cox – Gillingham 2004–05
Carlos Edwards – Luton Town, Sunderland, Wolverhampton Wanderers, Ipswich Town, Millwall 2005–07, 2009–15
Gavin Hoyte – Watford 2008–09
Justin Hoyte – Middlesbrough, Millwall 2009–15
Clayton Ince – Crewe Alexandra, Coventry City 2004–06
Stern John – Coventry City, Derby County, Sunderland, Southampton, Bristol City, Crystal Palace, Ipswich Town 2004–10
Kenwyne Jones – Southampton, Stoke City, Cardiff City, Bournemouth 2004–08, 2014–16
Daniel Phillips – Watford 2020–21
Jlloyd Samuel – Cardiff City  2010–11
Jason Scotland – Swansea City, Ipswich Town, Barnsley 2008–09, 2010–14
Jake Thomson – Southampton 2008–09
Tony Warner – Cardiff City, Leeds United, Norwich City, Barnsley, Scunthorpe United 2004–08, 2010–11
Dwight Yorke – Sunderland 2006–07

Tunisia 
Aymen Belaïd – Rotherham United 2015–17
Yohan Benalouane – Nottingham Forest – 2018–20
Tijani Belaid – Hull City 2010–11
Idris El Mizouni – Ipswich Town 2018–19
Radhi Jaïdi – Birmingham City, Southampton 2008–09, 2011–12
Wahbi Khazri – Sunderland 2017–18
Hannibal Mejbri – Birmingham City 2022–
Bilel Mohsni – Ipswich Town 2012–13
Mehdi Nafti – Birmingham City 2006–07, 2008–09
Omar Rekik – Wigan Athletic 2022–

Turkey 
Nadir Çiftçi – Portsmouth 2010–11
Halil Dervişoğlu – Brentford, Burnley 2019–20, 2022–
Kerim Frei – Cardiff City F.C., Birmingham City 2012–13, 2016–17
Jem Karacan – Reading, Bolton 2008–12, 2013–15, 2017–18
Erhun Oztumer – Bolton, Charlton 2018-19, 2019-20
Colin Kazim-Richards – Brighton & Hove Albion, Blackburn Rovers, Derby County 2005–06, 2012–13, 2020–22
Anıl Koç – Charlton 2013–14
Tuncay – Middlesbrough 2009–10
 Tamer Tuna – Charlton 2008–09
Tiago Çukur – Watford 2021–22
Ozan Tufan – Hull City 2022–
Doğukan Sinik – Hull City 2022–
Okay Yokuşlu – West Bromwich Albion 2022–

Uganda 
Uche Ikpeazu – Wycombe Wanderers, Middlesbrough, Cardiff City 2020–
 Jayden Onen – Reading 2020–2021

Ukraine 
Serhii Rebrov – West Ham United 2004–05

United States 
 Gboly Ariyibi – Leeds United 2013–14
 Paul Arriola – Swansea City 2020–21
Geoff Cameron – Stoke City, Queens Park Rangers 2018–21
 Cameron Carter-Vickers – Sheffield United, Ipswich Town, Swansea, Stoke City, Luton Town, Bournemouth 2017–21
 Bobby Convey – Reading 2004–06, 2008–09
 Kenny Cooper – Plymouth Argyle 2009–10
Vaughn Covil – Hull City 2022–
 Cody Cropper – Milton Keynes Dons 2015–16
 Luca de la Torre – Fulham 2017–18, 2019–20
 Jay DeMerit – Watford 2004–06, 2007–10
 Daryl Dike – Barnsley, West Bromwich 2020–
 Conor Doyle – Derby County 2010–13
 Robbie Findley – Nottingham Forest 2010–12
Lynden Gooch – Sunderland 2017–18, 2022–
 Mike Grella – Leeds United 2010–11
 Brad Guzan – Hull City 2010–11
 Marcus Hahnemann – Reading 2004–06, 2008–09
 Stuart Holden – Bolton Wanderers, Sheffield Wednesday 2012–14
 Duane Holmes – Huddersfield Town, Yeovil Town, Derby County 2013–14, 2015–16, 2018–
Matthew Hoppe – Middlesbrough 2022–
Ethan Horvath – Nottingham Forest, Luton Town 2021–
 Emerson Hyndman – Fulham 2014–16
 Eddie Johnson – Cardiff City, Preston North End 2008–09, 2010–11
 Jemal Johnson – Preston North End, Wolverhampton Wanderers, Leeds United 2005–07
 Danny Karbassiyoon – Ipswich Town, Burnley 2004–06
Charlie Kelman – Queens Park Rangers 2020–
 Eddie Lewis – Preston North End , Leeds 2004–07
 Eric Lichaj – Leeds United, Nottingham Forest, Hull City 2010–11, 2013–20
Matt Miazga – Reading 2018–20
Jordan Morris – Swansea City 2020–21
Andrija Novakovich – Reading 2014–15, 2019–20
Matthew Olosunde – Rotherham United, Preston 2020–
Oguchi Onyewu – Sheffield Wednesday, Charlton 2013–15
Will Packwood – Birmingham City 2012–15
Tim Ream – Bolton Wanderers, Fulham 2012–18, 2019–20, 2021–22
Antonee Robinson – Bolton Wanderers, Wigan Athletic, Fulham 2017–20, 2021–22
 Robbie Rogers – Leeds United 2011–12
Josh Sargent – Norwich City 2022–
 Brek Shea – Barnsley, Birmingham City 2013–15
 Frank Simek – Queens Park Rangers , Sheffield Wednesday 2004–10
 Jonathan Spector – Birmingham City 2011–17
Zack Steffen – Middlesbrough 2022–
Jonathan Tomkinson – Norwich City 2022–
Auston Trusty – Birmingham City 2022–
 Zak Whitbread – Millwall, Norwich City, Leicester City, Derby County 2005–06, 2010–11, 2012–15
Danny Williams – Reading, Huddersfield Town 2013–17
 DeAndre Yedlin – Newcastle United 2016–17
 David Yelldell – Brighton & Hove Albion 2004–05

Uruguay  
 Diego Arismendi – Barnsley 2010–11
 Carlos de Pena – Middlesbrough 2015–16
 Javier Chevantón – Queens Park Rangers 2013–14
Abel Hernández – Hull City 2015–16, 2017–18
 Diego Poyet – Charlton, Huddersfield Town, Milton Keynes Dons 2013–16
 Gastón Ramírez – Middlesbrough 2015–16
 Leandro Rodríguez – Brentford 2015–16
 Cristhian Stuani – Middlesbrough 2015–16

Venezuela 
Fernando Amorebieta – Fulham, Middlesbrough 2014–16

Zimbabwe 
Benjani – Portsmouth 2011–12
Onismor Bhasera – Plymouth Argyle 2009–10
Macauley Bonne – Charlton Athletic, Queens Park Rangers 2019–21, 2022–
Adam Chicksen – Brighton & Hove Albion 2013–15
Tendayi Darikwa – Burnley, Nottingham Forest, Wigan Athletic 2015–16, 2017–19, 2022–
Admiral Muskwe – Wycombe Wanderers, Luton Town 2020–
Marvelous Nakamba – Luton Town – 2022–
Bradley Pritchard – Charlton Athletic 2012–14
Jordan Zemura –Bournemouth – 2020–22

Notes

References
 Footballdatabase.eu
 Soccerway.com

EFL Championship records and statistics

England
Association football player non-biographical articles